= Neurovascular bundle =

Structure binding nerves and vessels

A neurovascular bundle is a structure that binds nerves and veins (and in some cases arteries and lymphatics) with connective tissue so that they travel in tandem through the body.

== Structure ==
There are two types of neurovascular bundles: superficial bundles and deep bundles. As arteries do not travel within the superficial fascia, the loose connective tissue under the skin, superficial neurovascular bundles differ from deep neurovascular bundles in both composition and function.

=== Superficial bundles ===
Superficial neurovascular bundles do not include arteries, and consist primarily of capillaries and nerves. Because capillaries function as the sites for substance exchange between interstitial fluid and blood, they tend to have large surface area and short diffusion path. Normally, capillaries consist of a central lumen lined with an endothelium, a single layer of smooth epithelial cells.

=== Deep bundles ===
Deep neurovascular bundles, which often include arteries, have a more complicated structure than superficial neurovascular bundles. Since arteries have high intraluminal blood pressure relative to capillaries and veins, these bundles have smooth muscle and connective tissue structures outside the endothelium. This structure allows arteries to contract, relax and remain flexible and transfer blood when under pressure.

== Function ==
Neurovascular bundles are useful for axons, ensuring a continuous supply of oxygenated blood to important nerves.

== Clinical significance ==
Both superficial and deep neurovascular bundles are at risk during surgical incisions.

=== Leg surgery ===
In surgeries, the principle superficial neurovascular bundles at risk are, medially, the great saphenous vein and its accompanying nerve, and, laterally, the superficial fibular nerve. The superficial fibular nerve originates from the common fibular nerve near the neck of the fibula and passes between the fibularis longus and brevis muscles, supplying motor branches to these muscles. The superficial branch then continues onto the dorsum of the foot to supply sensory fibers to the skin there.

The main deep neurovascular bundle at risk is the posterior tibial artery. It lies on the posterior aspect of the tibialis posterior and flexor digitorum longus muscle, and medial to the belly of flexor hallucis longus muscle. It also gives rise to medial plantar artery and lateral plantar artery.

During surgery, these neurovascular bundles, both superficial and deep, should be protected in order to prevent neurological damage. A common anatomically informed, surgical technique to avoid damaging neurovascular bundles is to undermine anteriorly to the posterior tibial margin after reaching the fascia, in order to avoid the saphenous vein and nerve. The deep posterior compartment here is superficial and readily accessible. The fascia of the deep posterior compartment is carefully opened distally and proximally, under the belly of the soleus muscle, paying special attention to the posterior tibial neurovascular bundle. Through the same incision, the fascia of the superficial posterior compartment is opened widely, two centimeters posterior and parallel to the incision in the fascia of the deep compartment.

=== Prostate surgery ===
The preservation of both neurovascular bundles during nerve-sparing (NS) radical prostatectomy improves urinary continence and erectile function. Consequently, NS is recommended in elderly men and those with pre-existing erectile dysfunction, whom many surgeons would previously have only offered non-NS surgery. It was also found that during surgeries in which neurovascular bundles are preserved, the frequency of positive margins were only 5.8 percent.
