= Fibularis muscles =

Group of muscles in the lower leg

- Fibularis (peroneus) muscles

Details
- Origin: Head of the fibula, proximal 2/3 of lateral surface of fibula, intermuscular septa
- Insertion: Medial cuneiform bone, metatarsal bone 1
- Actions: Talocrural joint: foot plantar flexion Subtalar joint: foot eversion Supports longitudinal and transverse arches of foot

Identifiers
- Latin: musculus fibularis

The fibularis muscles (also called peroneus muscles or peroneals) is a group of muscles in the lower leg.

== Description ==
The muscle group is normally composed of three muscles: fibularis longus, fibularis brevis, and fibularis tertius.

The fibularis longus and fibularis brevis are located in the lateral compartment of the leg and are supplied by the fibular artery and the superficial fibular nerve. The fibularis tertius is located in the anterior compartment of the leg and is supplied by the anterior tibial artery and the deep fibular nerve. While all three muscles move the sole of the foot outward, away from the midline of the body (eversion), the longus and brevis extend the foot downward away from the body (plantar flexion), whereas the tertius muscle pulls the foot upward toward the body (dorsiflexion).

Name	Compartment	Action	Nerve	Artery
Fibularis longus	lateral compartment	eversion and plantar flexion	superficial fibular nerve	fibular artery
Fibularis brevis	lateral compartment	eversion and plantar flexion	superficial fibular nerve	fibular artery
Fibularis tertius	anterior compartment	eversion and dorsiflexion	deep fibular nerve	anterior tibial artery

The fibularis muscles are highly variable. Several variants are occasionally present, including the peroneus digiti minimi and the peroneus quartus. The quartus is more closely associated with the tendons of the extensor digitorum longus and may send a small tendon to the fifth (or little) toe.

== Nomenclature ==
Terminologia Anatomica designates "fibularis" as the preferred word over "peroneus".

== Additional images ==
Animation: Fibularis (peroneus) muscles seen from below

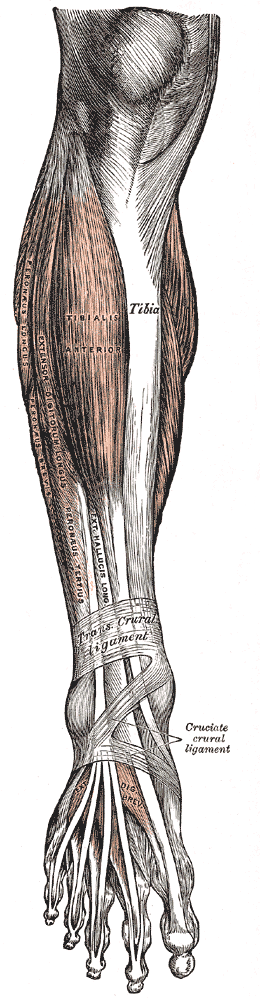
Fibularis (peroneus) muscles labeled at center left

== See also ==
- Fibula
