= Peroneal =

Peroneal may refer to:

- Relating to the lateral compartment of leg
- Peroneal artery
- Peroneal vein
- Peroneus muscles
- Peroneal nerve

== See also ==
- Perineal (disambiguation)
- Peritoneal
