= Flexor digiti minimi brevis =

Flexor digiti minimi brevis may refer to:

- Flexor digiti minimi brevis muscle of hand
- Flexor digiti minimi brevis muscle of foot
