= Schilling tendon procedure =

- Specialty: Orthopedic

The Schilling tendon procedure is a temporary surgical procedure developed by the former Boston Red Sox team physician William Morgan, MD, to stabilize the peroneus brevis tendon so that it is prevented from anterior displacement during ankle eversion. If the peroneal retinaculum is torn, the fibular retinacula are no longer stabilized. This allows the peroneus brevis tendon to move untethered over the lateral malleolus, creating pain. During pitching mechanics, the snapping of the tendon over the bone is painful and distracting to the pitcher.

The procedure involves the placement of three sutures through the skin anterior to the path of the peroneus brevis tendon and into the underlying deep connective tissue. These sutures provide a temporary barrier, preventing the tendon from moving anteriorly over the malleolus. This procedure was first tested on a cadaver to establish if the surgery would work or not. The procedure is performed with local anaesthetic, about 24 hours before the player begins to pitch. The stitches must be removed immediately following the cessation of play, and indications are that the stitches may tear during the course of a game.

The procedure is named for Major League Baseball pitcher Curt Schilling, who required the surgery to be able to pitch for the Boston Red Sox in Game 6 of the 2004 American League Championship Series and Game 2 of the 2004 World Series.
