= Fibularis tertius =

Muscle of the human body located in the lower limb

- Animation

Details
- Origin: Distal anterior surface of the fibula also the interosseous membrane
- Insertion: Dorsal surface of metatarsal 5
- Artery: Anterior tibial artery
- Nerve: Deep fibular nerve
- Actions: Dorsiflexion and eversion of the foot

Identifiers
- Latin: musculus fibularis tertius
- TA98: A04.7.02.039
- TA2: 2649
- FMA: 22538

In human anatomy, the fibularis tertius (historically known as the peroneus tertius) is a muscle in the anterior compartment of the leg. It acts to tilt the sole of the foot away from the midline of the body (eversion) and to pull the foot upward toward the body (dorsiflexion).

== Structure ==
The fibularis tertius arises from the lower third of the front surface of the fibula, the lower part of the interosseous membrane, and septum, or connective tissue, between it and the fibularis brevis. The septum is sometimes called the intermuscular septum of Otto.

The muscle passes downward and ends in a tendon that passes under the superior extensor retinaculum and the inferior extensor retinaculum of the foot in the same canal as the extensor digitorum longus muscle. It may be mistaken as a fifth tendon of the extensor digitorum longus. The tendon inserts into the dorsal (superior) surface of the base of the fifth metatarsal bone.

The fibularis tertius is supplied by the deep fibular nerve. In rare cases, it may also be supplied by the common fibular nerve. This is unlike the other fibularis muscles, which are located in the lateral compartment of the leg and are supplied by the superficial fibular nerve, since the fibularis tertius is found in the anterior compartment of the leg.

The fibularis tertius may be absent in humans. It may be absent in as few as 5% of people, or as many as 72%, depending on the population surveyed. It is rarely found in other primates, which is one reason its function has been linked to efficient bipedalism.

== Function ==
As a weak dorsiflexor of the ankle joint, the fibularis tertius assists in pulling the foot upward toward the body. It also assists in tilting the sole of the foot away from midline of the body at the ankle (eversion). Its evolution is presumably linked to the evolution of terrestrial bipedalism, and seen to improve the efficiency of walking upright.

== Clinical significance ==
The fibularis tertius may be impacted by ankle injuries involving its hyperextension, and may rupture.

It also may be imaged using medical ultrasound.

== Nomenclature and etymology ==
Terminologia Anatomica designates "fibularis" as the preferred word over "peroneus.".

The word "peroneus" comes from the Greek word "perone," meaning pin of a brooch or a buckle. In medical terminology, the word refers to being of or relating to the fibula or to the outer portion of the leg.

== Other animals ==
The fibularis tertius muscle in horses originates from the near the lateral condyle of the femur, passes through the extensor sulcus on the head of the tibia, and inserts onto the third metatarsal bone, the third and fourth tarsal bones, and the calcaneus. Rupture of the muscle may cause the Achilles tendon to have a slight dip.

== Additional images ==
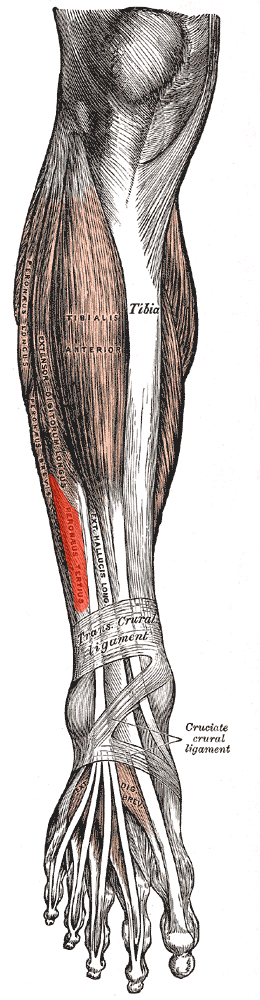
Muscles of the front of the leg (fibularis tertius visible at center left).

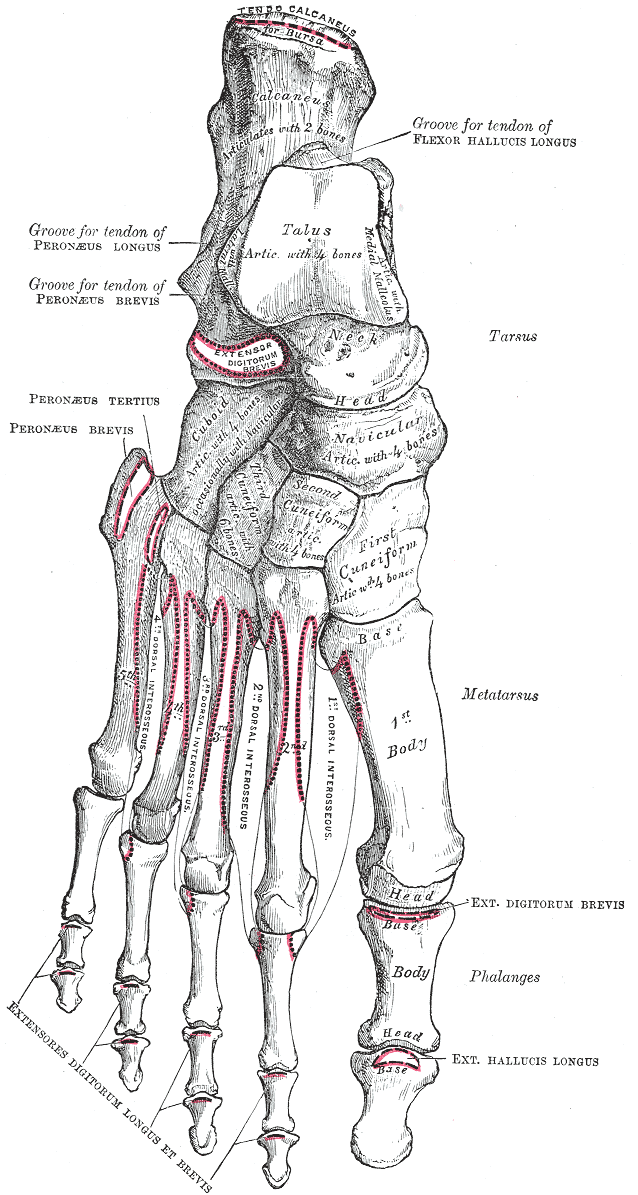
Bones of the right foot (dorsal surface).

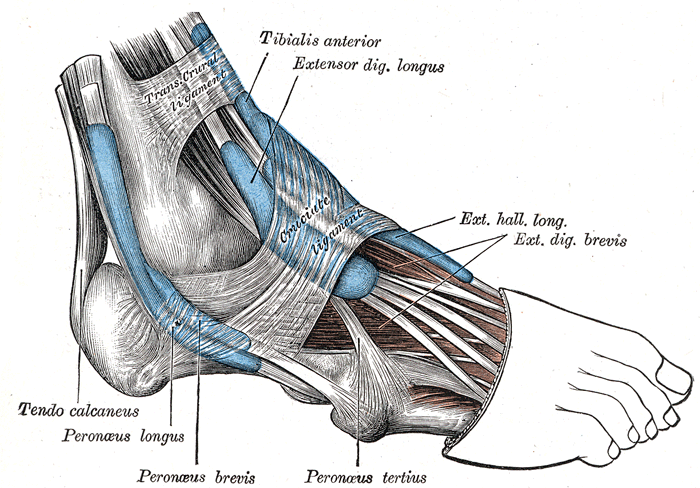
The mucous sheaths of the tendons around the ankle (lateral aspect).

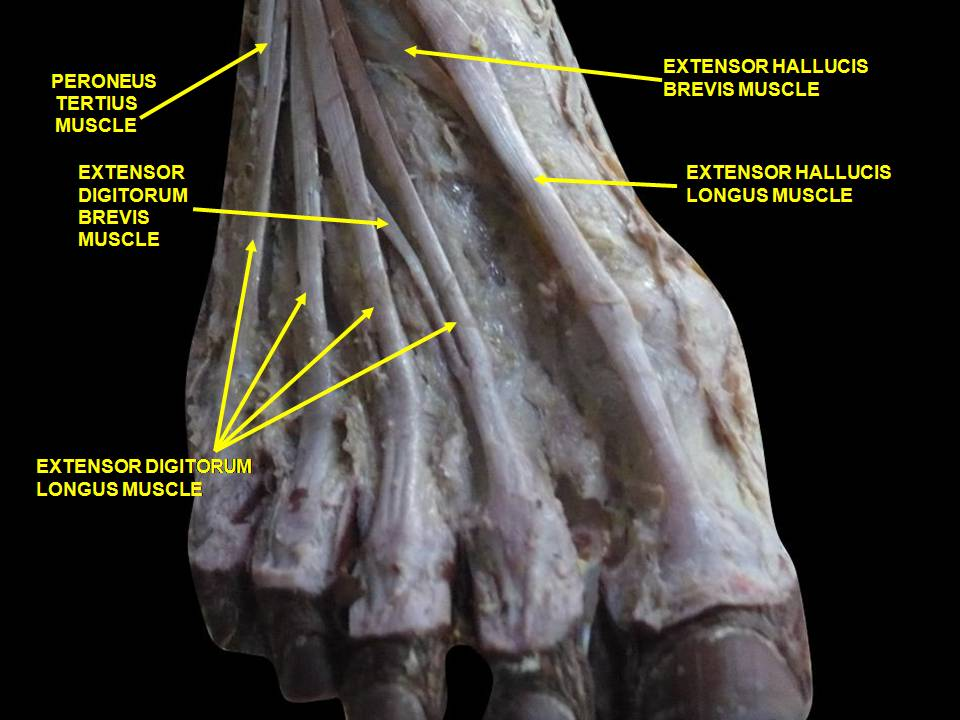
Dorsum of foot. Deep dissection.

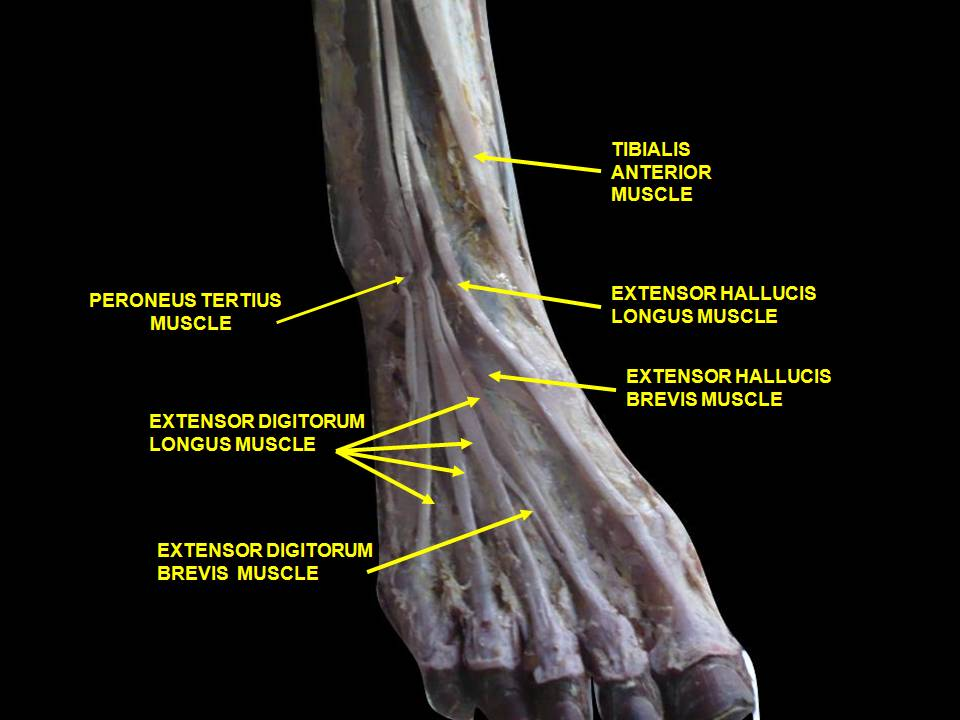
Dorsum of foot. Deep dissection.

== See also ==
- Fibularis muscles
  - Fibularis longus
  - Fibularis brevis
