= Flexor digiti quinti brevis muscle =

Flexor digiti quinti brevis muscle may refer to:

- Flexor digiti minimi brevis muscle of foot
- Flexor digiti minimi brevis muscle of hand
