= Jones fracture =

Fracture of the fifth metatarsal bone of the foot

- Other names: Fracture of the metaphysis of the fifth metatarsal
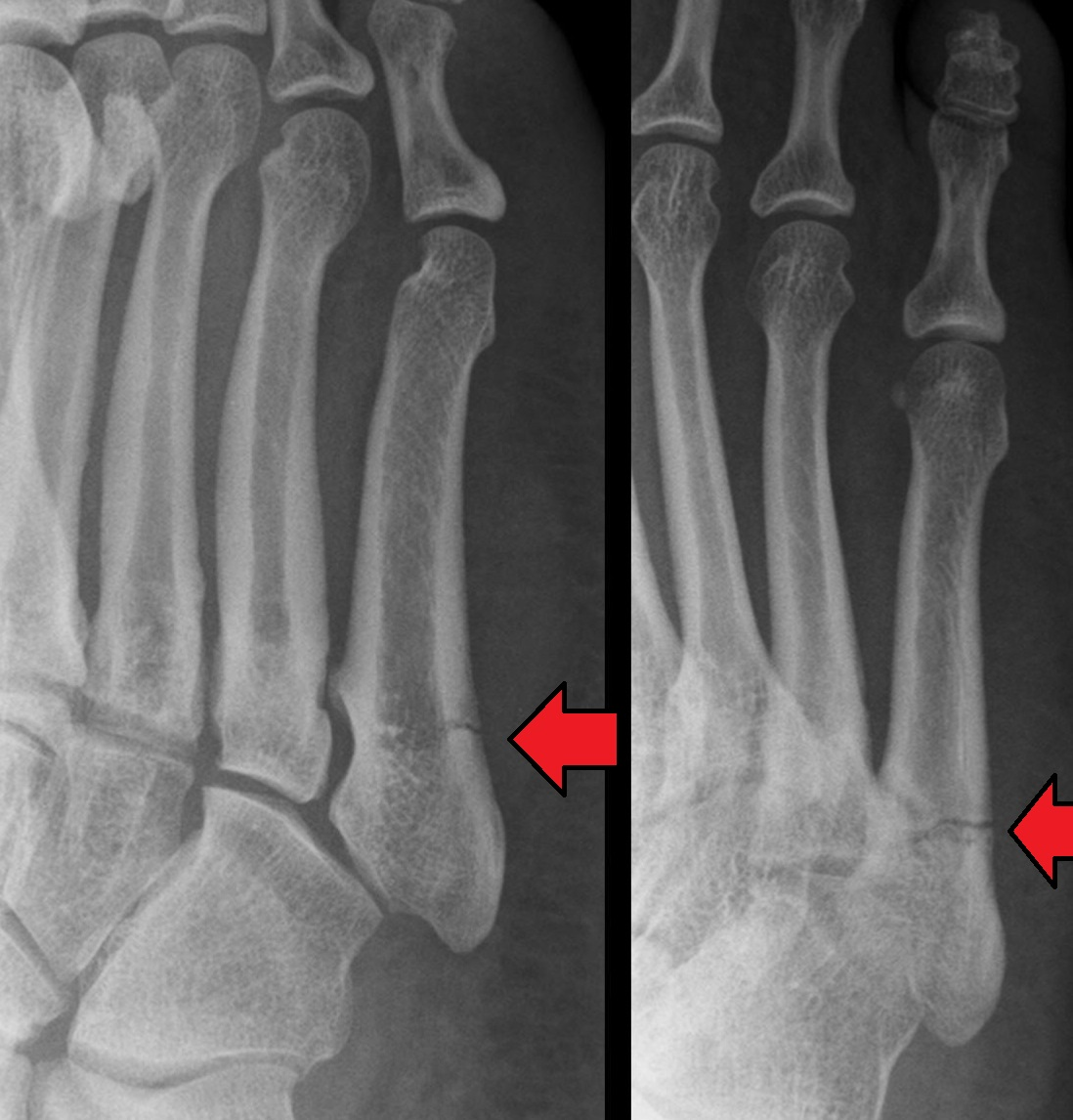
- Jones fracture as seen on Xray
- Specialty: Emergency medicine, orthopedics, podiatry
- Symptoms: Pain near the midportion of the foot on the outside, bruising
- Usual onset: Sudden
- Duration: 6-12 weeks to heal
- Causes: Bending the foot inwards when the toes are pointed
- Diagnostic method: Based on symptoms, X-rays
- Differential diagnosis: Pseudo-Jones fracture, normal growth plate
- Treatment: Non-weight bearing, cast, surgery

A Jones fracture is a broken bone in a specific part of the fifth metatarsal of the foot between the base and middle part. In general, fifth metatarsal fractures heal readily, but a Jones fracture must be recognized and accurately diagnosed because of its higher rate of delayed healing or nonunion. It results in pain near the midportion of the foot on the outside. There may also be bruising and difficulty walking. Onset is generally sudden.

The fracture typically occurs when the toes are pointed and the foot bends inwards. This movement may occur in changing direction while the heel is off the ground such in dancing, tennis, or basketball. Diagnosis is generally suspected based on symptoms and confirmed with X-rays.

Initial treatment is typically in a cast, without bearing weight on it, for at least six weeks. If, after this period of time, healing has not occurred, a further six weeks of casting may be recommended. Due to poor blood supply in this area, the break sometimes does not heal and surgery is required. In athletes, or if the pieces of bone are separated, surgery may be considered sooner. The fracture was first described in 1902 by the orthopedic surgeon Robert Jones, who sustained it while dancing.

== Diagnosis ==
A person with a Jones fracture may not realize that a fracture has occurred. Diagnosis includes the palpation of an intact fibularis brevis tendon, and demonstration of local tenderness distal to the tuberosity of the fifth metatarsal, and localized over the shaft of the proximal metatarsal.

Diagnostic X-rays include anteroposterior, oblique, and lateral views and should be made with the foot in full flexion.

=== Differential diagnosis ===
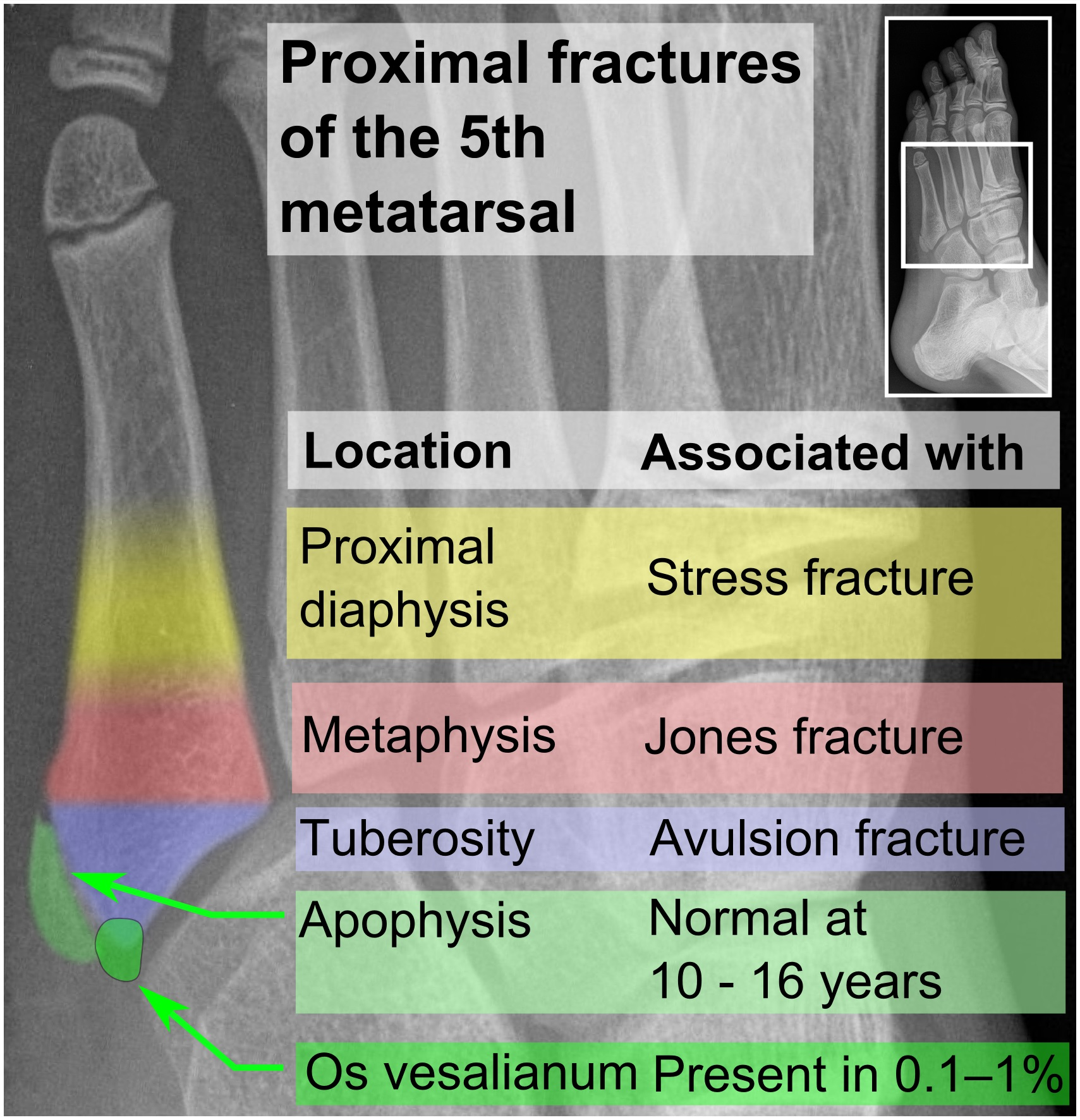
Proximal fractures of the fifth metatarsal bone: Proximal diaphysis, typically stress fracture.; Metaphysis: Jones fracture; -Tuberosity: Pseudo-Jones fracture (avulsion fracture). Normal anatomy: Apophysis: Normal at 10 - 16 years.; Os vesalianum, an accessory bone.

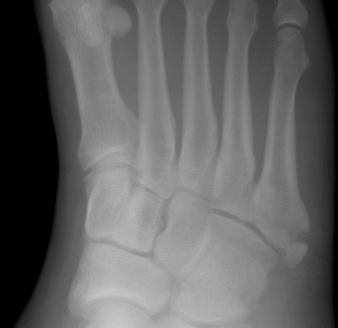
Pseudo-Jones fracture

Other proximal fifth metatarsal fractures exist, although they are not as problematic as a Jones fracture. If the fracture enters the intermetatarsal joint, it is a Jones fracture. If, however, it enters the tarsometatarsal joint, then it is likely an avulsion fracture caused by pull from the fibularis brevis tendon. An avulsion fracture at the base of the fifth metatarsal is sometimes called a "dancer's fracture" or a "pseudo Jones fracture", and usually responds readily to non-operative treatment. The X-ray appearance of the developmental "apophysis" in this area may have some resemblance of a fracture, but is not a fracture; it is the secondary ossification center of the metatarsal bone. It is a normal finding that occurs at this site in adolescents. If an injury to that area has occurred, the physician is often able to interpret certain radiographic clues to make the differentiation. An avulsion fracture at this location is typically extra-articular and oriented transversally as compared to the longitudinal orientation of an unfused apophysis.

== Treatment ==
=== Casting ===
Initial treatment is typically in a cast, without any weight being placed on it, for at least six weeks. If after this period of time healing has not occurred a further six weeks of casting may be recommended. Up to half, however, may not heal after casting.

=== Surgery ===
In athletes or if the pieces of bone are separated by more than 2 mm surgery may be considered. In a study of all players who entered the NFL Scouting Combine from 2009 to 2015, the incidence of Jones fracture was 3.2% and all had received surgery to repair the fracture with a metal screw. For persons who are not athletes, surgery might not be recommended unless healing does not occur after a trial of cast treatment.

== Prognosis ==
For several reasons, a Jones fracture may not unite. The diaphyseal bone (zone II), where the fracture occurs, is an area of potentially poor blood supply, existing in a watershed area between two blood supplies. This may compromise healing. In addition, there are various tendons, including the fibularis brevis and fibularis tertius, and two small muscles attached to the bone. These may pull the fracture apart and prevent healing.

Zones I and III have been associated with relatively guaranteed union and this union has taken place with only limited restriction of activity combined with early immobilization. On the other hand, zone II has been associated with either delayed or non-union and, consequently, it has been generally agreed that fractures in this area should be considered for some form of internal immobilization, such as internal screw fixation.

These zones can be identified anatomically and on x-ray adding to the clinical usefulness of this classification. Surgical intervention is not, by itself, a guarantee of cure and has its own complication rate. Other reviews of the literature have concluded that conservative, non-operative, treatment is an acceptable option for the non-athlete.

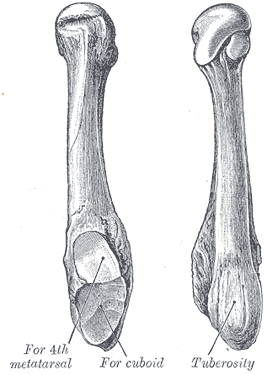
Anatomy of the fifth metatarsal.

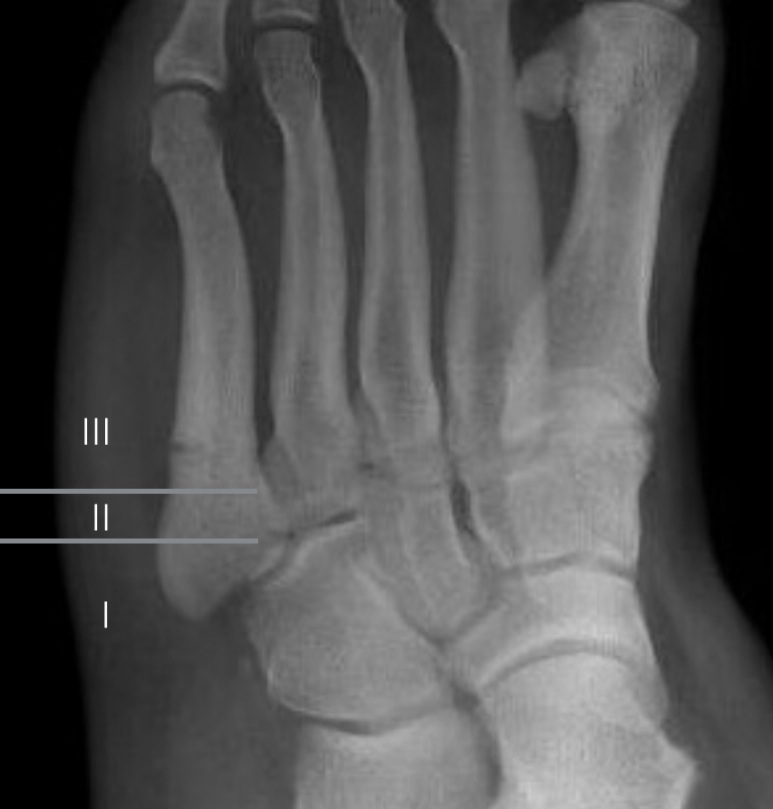
3 zone description

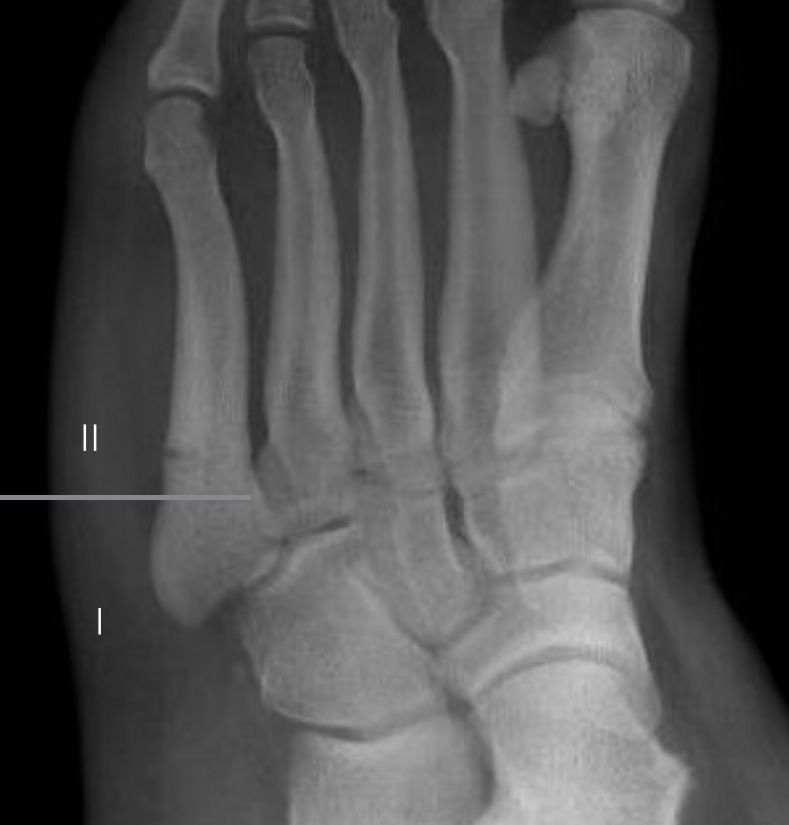
2 zone description
