= Tibial-fibular trunk =

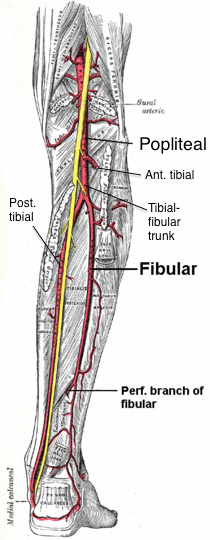
- Picture of arteries of the lower limb, showing fibular artery and its source, the posterior tibial artery. The perforating branch of fibular artery is also shown as is the tibial-fibular trunk.

Details

Identifiers
- Latin: truncus tibiofibularis

Tibiofibular trunk (or tibioperoneal trunk) is an arterial trunk representing the direct continuation of the popliteal artery distal to where the anterior tibial artery (the first branch of the popliteal artery) branches off from it. The tibiofibular trunk terminates by bifurcating into two terminal branches: the posterior tibial artery, and the fibular artery. This is the most common configuration of the origins of these arteries, however, many other anatomical variations exist.

The vessel here described as the tibiofibular trunk may alternately be regarded as the initial portion of the posterior tibial artery, with the fibular artery instead regarded as its branch.
