= Fifth metatarsal bone =

Long bone in the foot

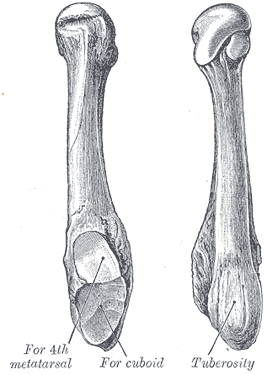
- The fifth metatarsal. (Left.)

- Bones of the right foot. Dorsal surface. Fifth metatarsal bone is the yellow bone farthest the right

Details

Identifiers
- Latin: os metatarsale V
- TA2: 1502
- FMA: 24506

The fifth metatarsal bone is a long bone in the foot, and is palpable along the distal outer edges of the feet. It is the second smallest of the five metatarsal bones. The fifth metatarsal is analogous to the fifth metacarpal bone in the hand.

As with the four other metatarsal bones it can be divided into three parts; a base, body and head. The base is the part closest to the ankle and the head is closest to the toes. The narrowed part in the middle is referred to as the body (or shaft) of the bone. The bone is somewhat flat giving it two surfaces; the plantar (towards the sole of the foot) and the dorsal side (the area facing upwards while standing). These surfaces are rough for the attachment of ligaments. The bone is curved longitudinally, so as to be concave below, slightly convex above.

The base articulates behind, by a triangular surface cut obliquely in a transverse direction, with the cuboid; and medially, with the fourth metatarsal. The fifth metatarsal has a rough eminence on the lateral side of its base, known as the tuberosity or the styloid process. The plantar surface of the base is grooved for the tendon of the abductor digiti quinti.

The head articulates with the fifth proximal phalanx, the first bone in the fifth toe.

A strong band of the plantar aponeurosis connects the projecting part of the tuberosity with the lateral process of the tuberosity of the calcaneus.

== Proximal fractures ==
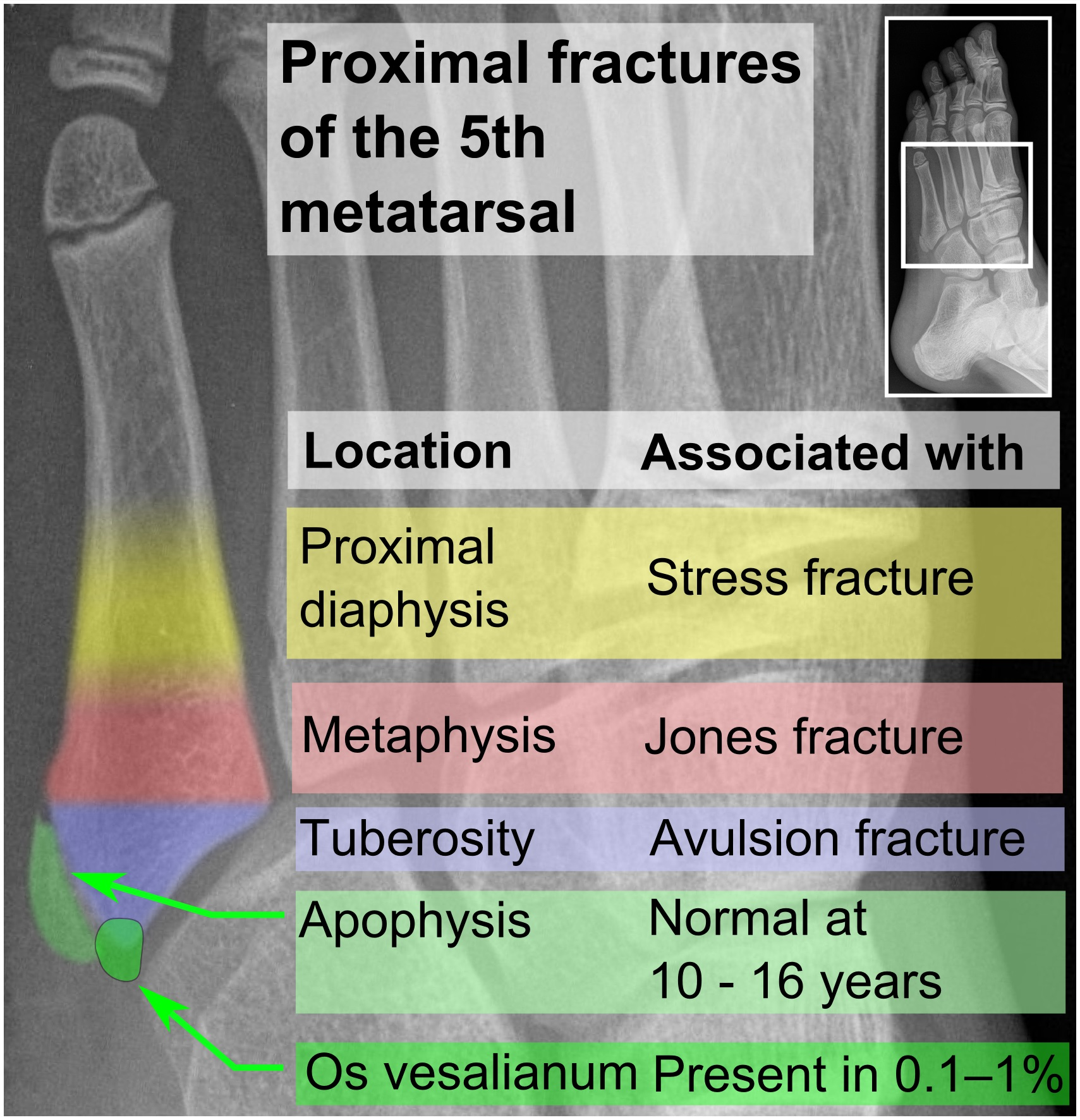

Proximal fractures of the fifth metatarsal are common, and are distinguished by their locations:

- A proximal diaphysis fracture is typically a stress fracture, commonly among athletes.
- A metaphysis fracture is also called a Jones fracture. Due to poor blood supply in this area, such a fracture sometimes does not heal and surgery is required.
- A tuberosity fracture is also called a pseudo-Jones fracture or a dancer's fracture. It is typically an avulsion fracture.

Normal anatomy that may simulate a fracture include mainly:

- The "apophysis", which is the secondary ossification center of the bone, and is normally present at 10 – 16 years of age.
- Os vesalianum, an accessory bone which is present in between 0.1 - 1% of the population.

== Muscle attachments ==
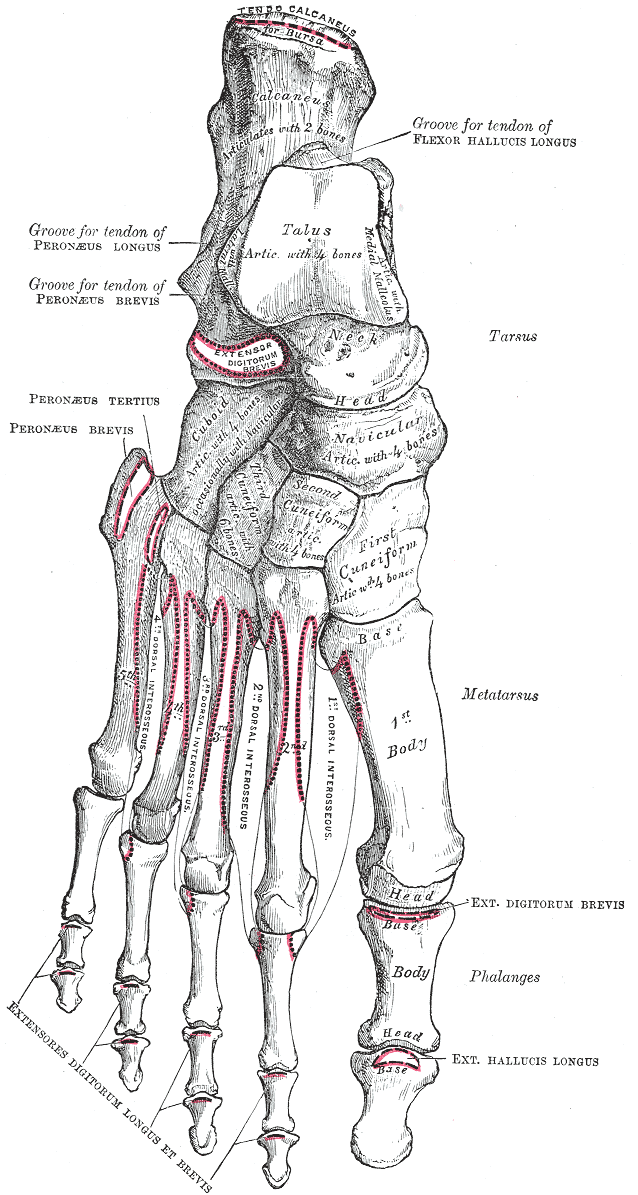
Muscle attachments (seen from above)

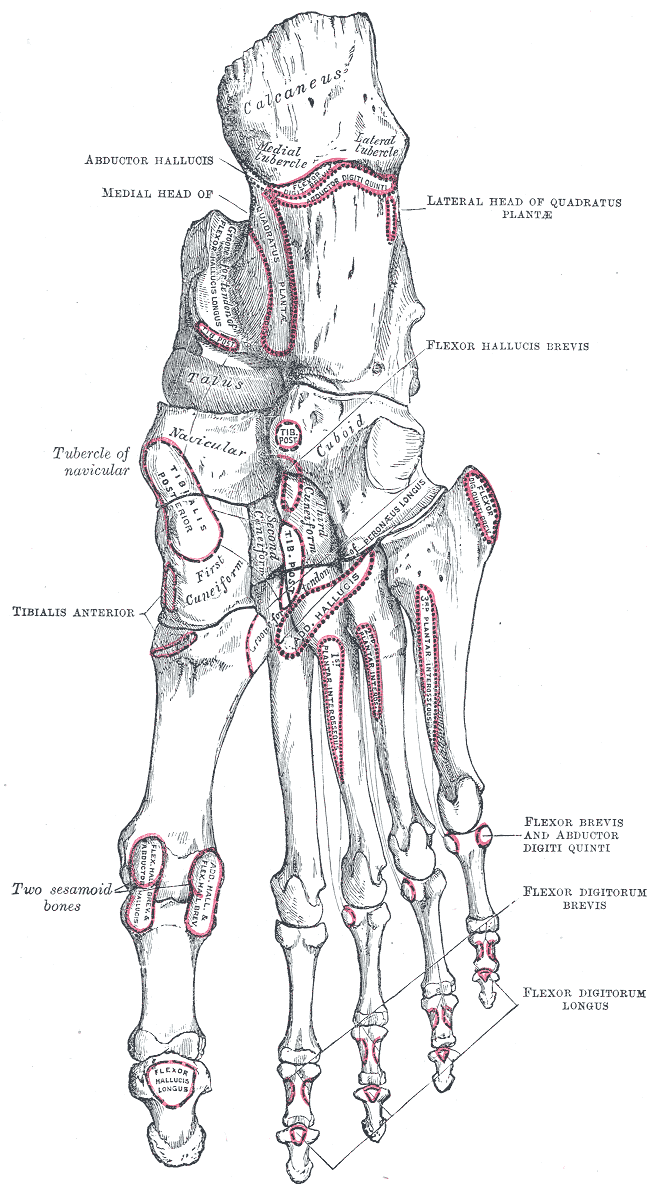
Muscle attachments (seen from below)

The tendon of the fibularis tertius inserts on the medial part of the dorsal surface and the fibularis brevis on the dorsal surface of the tuberosity.

The plantar surface of the base is grooved for the tendon of the abductor digiti quinti, and gives origin to the flexor digiti minimi brevis.

The fourth dorsal interosseus muscle originates from the medial side of shaft. The function of the muscle is to spread the toes.

The third Plantar interosseus muscle originates from the medial side of the base and shaft of the fifth metatarsal. The function of the muscle is to move the fourth toe medially and move the toes together.

The horizontal head of the adductor hallucis from the deep transverse metatarsal ligament, a narrow band which runs across and connects together the heads of all the metatarsal bones.

Muscle	Direction	Attachment
Fibularis tertius	Insertion	Dorsal side of the basis
Fibularis brevis	Insertion	Tuberosity
Flexor digiti minimi brevis	Origin	Plantar surface of the base
Dorsal interossei IV	Origin	Medial side of the shaft
Plantar interossei III	Origin	Medial side of the base and shaft
Horizontal head of adductor hallucis	Origin	Deep transverse metatarsal ligament

== Additional images ==
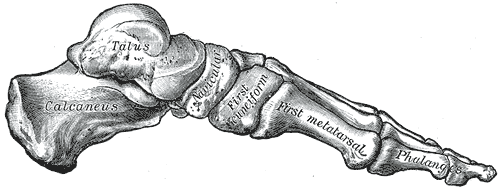
Skeleton of foot. Medial aspect.

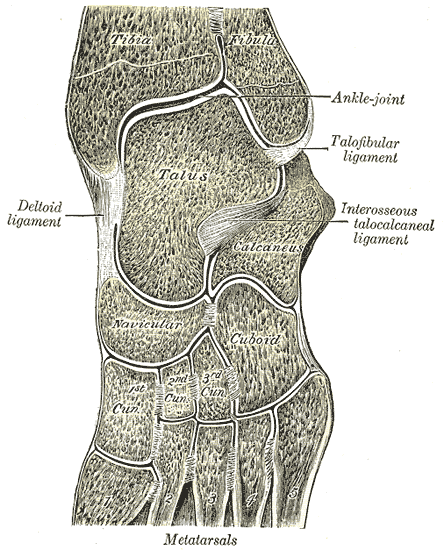
Oblique section of left intertarsal and tarsometatarsal articulations, showing the synovial cavities.

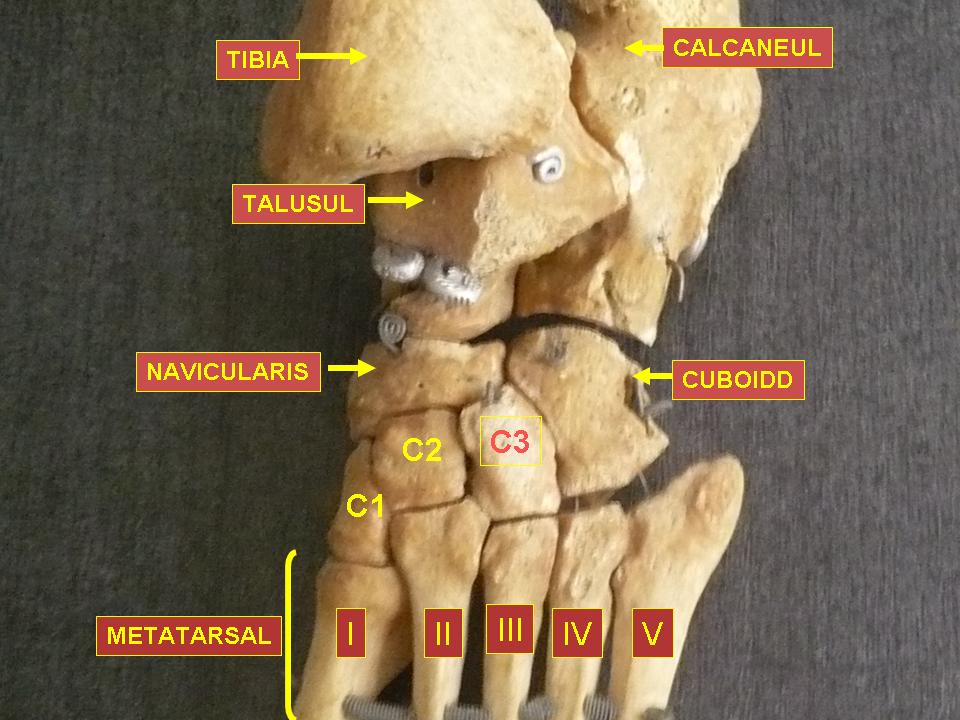
Foot bones – tarsus, metatarsus

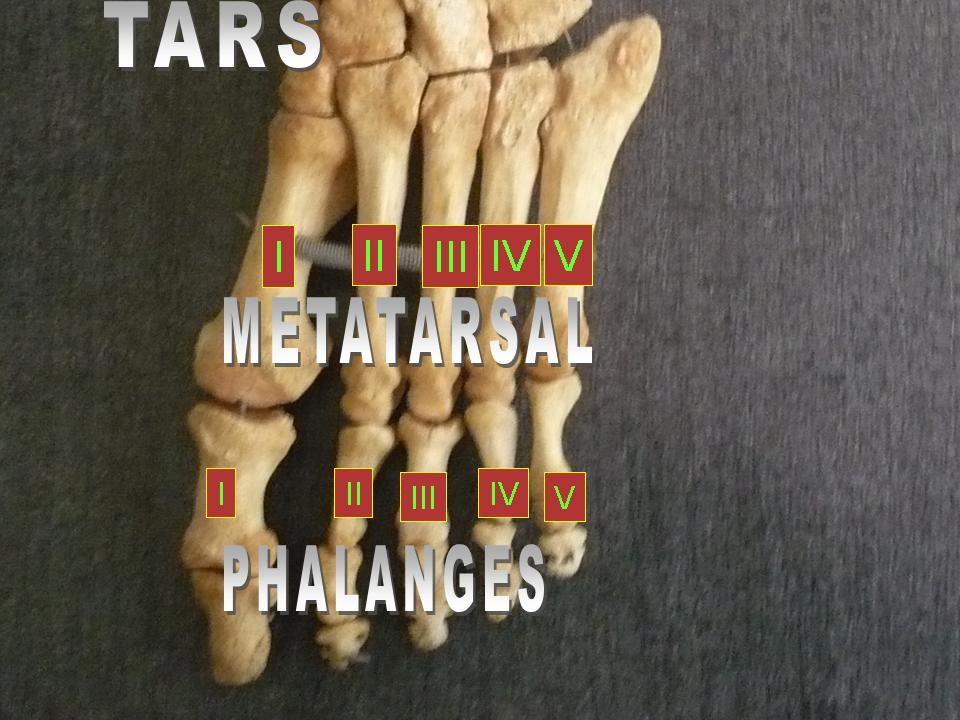
Foot bones – metatarsus and phalanges

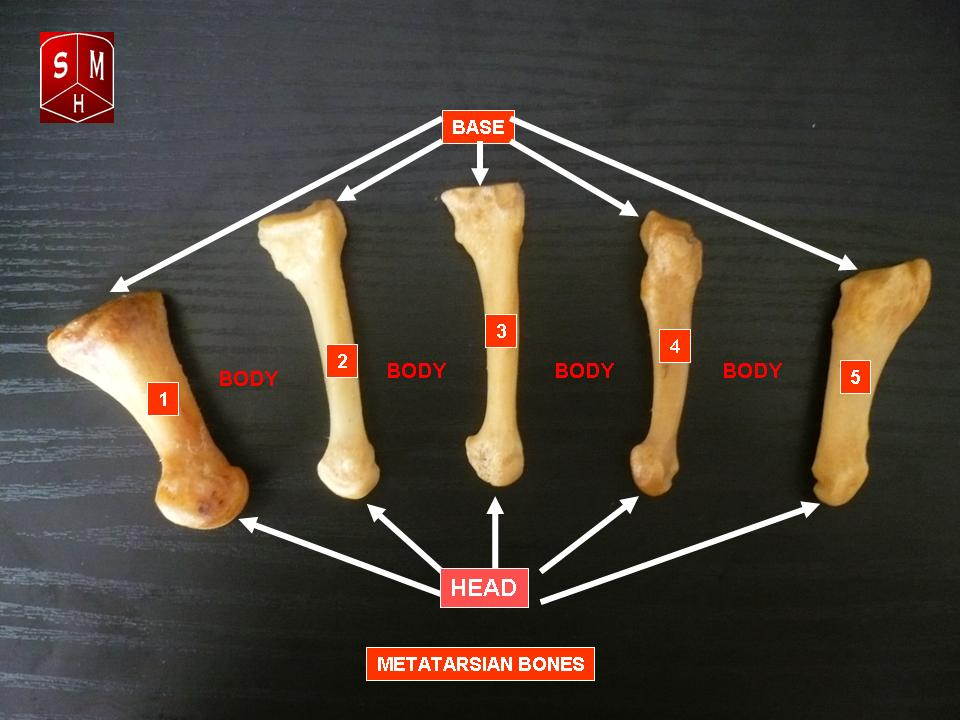
Metatarsus
