= Perineal =

Perineal may refer to:

- The perineum, the region of the body between the pubic arch and the tail bone
- Perineal artery, an artery supplying the perineal region
- Perineal nerve, a nerve innervating the perineal region

== See also ==
- Peroneal (disambiguation)
- Peritoneal
- Perennial (disambiguation)
