= Fibularis brevis =

Shorter and smaller of the fibularis (peroneus) muscles

Fibularis brevis muscle
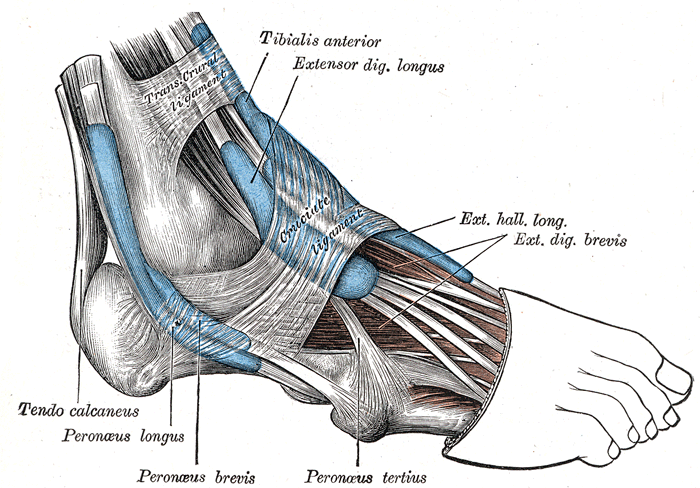
- The mucous sheaths of the tendons around the ankle. Lateral aspect. (Fibularis [peroneus] brevis labeled at bottom left.)

- Animation

Details
- Origin: Lower two-thirds of lateral fibula
- Insertion: Fifth metatarsal
- Artery: Fibular (peroneal) artery
- Nerve: Superficial fibular nerve
- Actions: Plantarflexion, eversion

Identifiers
- Latin: musculus fibularis brevis
- TA98: A04.7.02.042
- TA2: 2653
- FMA: 22540

In human anatomy, the fibularis brevis (or peroneus brevis) is a muscle that lies underneath the fibularis longus within the lateral compartment of the leg. It acts to tilt the sole of the foot away from the midline of the body (eversion) and to extend the foot downward away from the body at the ankle (plantar flexion).

== Structure ==
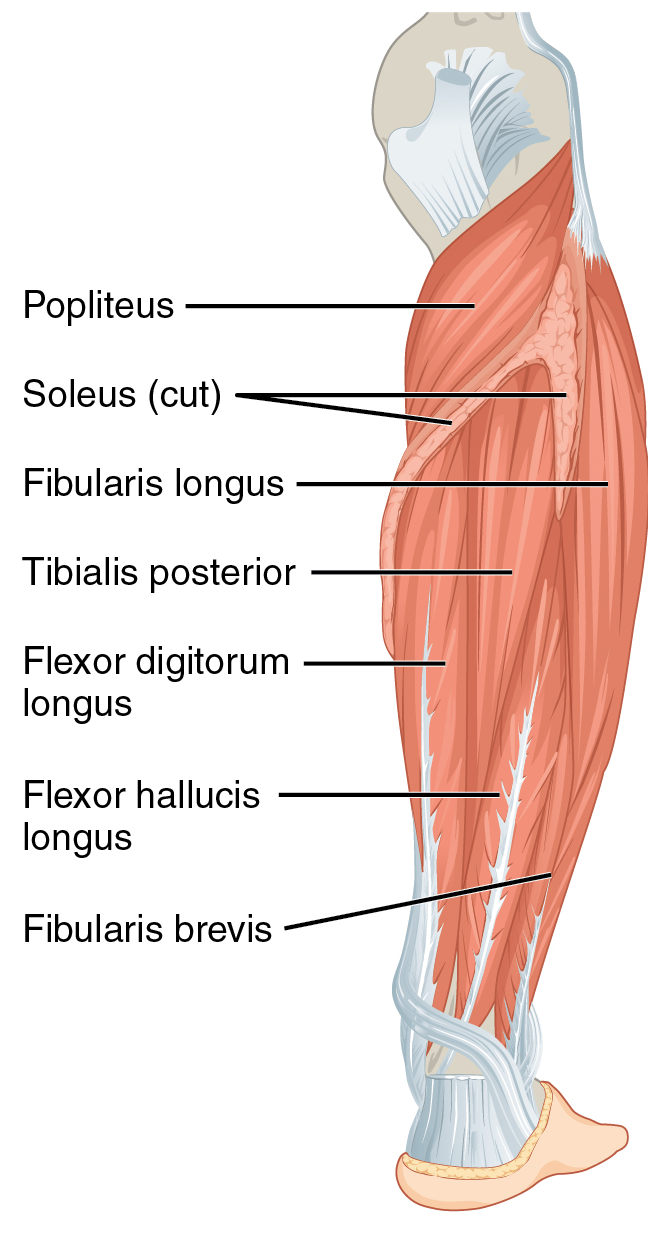
The fibularis brevis (bottom-most label) is a muscle of the lower leg and aids in plantar flexion and eversion of the foot.

The fibularis brevis arises from the lower two-thirds of the lateral, or outward, surface of the fibula (inward in relation to the fibularis longus) and from the connective tissue between it and the muscles on the front and back of the leg.

The muscle passes downward and ends in a tendon that runs behind the lateral malleolus of the ankle in a groove that it shares with the tendon of the fibularis longus; the groove is converted into a canal by the superior fibular retinaculum, and the tendons in it are contained in a common mucous sheath.

The tendon then runs forward along the lateral side of the calcaneus, above the calcaneal tubercle and the tendon of the fibularis longus. It inserts into the tuberosity at the base of the fifth metatarsal on its lateral side.

The fibularis brevis is supplied by the superficial fibular (peroneal) nerve.

== Function ==
The fibularis brevis is the strongest abductor of the foot. Together with the fibularis longus and the tibialis posterior, it extends the foot downward away from the body at the ankle (plantar flexion). It opposes the tibialis anterior and the fibularis tertius, which pull the foot upward toward the body (dorsiflexion). The fibularis longus also tilts the sole of the foot away from the midline of the body (eversion).

Together, the fibularis muscles help to steady the leg upon the foot, especially in standing on one leg.

== Clinical significance ==
When the base of the fifth metatarsal is fractured, the fibularis brevis may pull on and displace the upper fragment (known as a Jones fracture). An inversion sprain of the foot may pull the tendon such that it avulses the tuberosity at the base of the fifth metatarsal.

Fibularis brevis split tears are not uncommon as a source of lateral ankle pain. These tears are easily diagnosed with MRI imaging and sometimes with ultrasound. The tendon itself can develop tendinopathy or the common peroneal sheath develop tenosynovitis.

== Nomenclature and etymology ==
Terminologia Anatomica designates "fibularis" as the preferred word over "peroneus".

The word "peroneus" comes from the Greek word "perone," meaning pin of a brooch or a buckle. In medical terminology, the word refers to being of or relating to the fibula or to the outer portion of the leg.

== Additional images ==
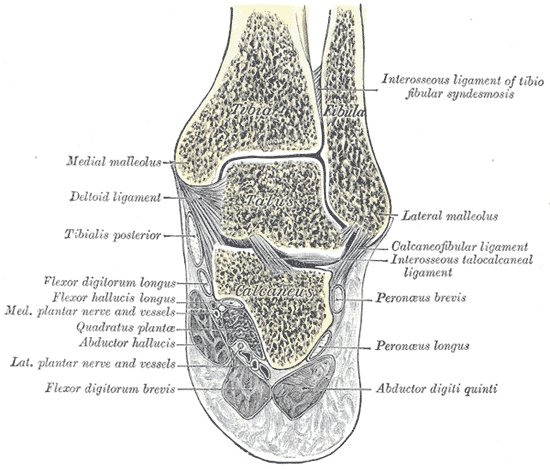
Coronal section through right ankle and subtalar joints. (Label for Peroneus brevis is at right, third from the bottom.)

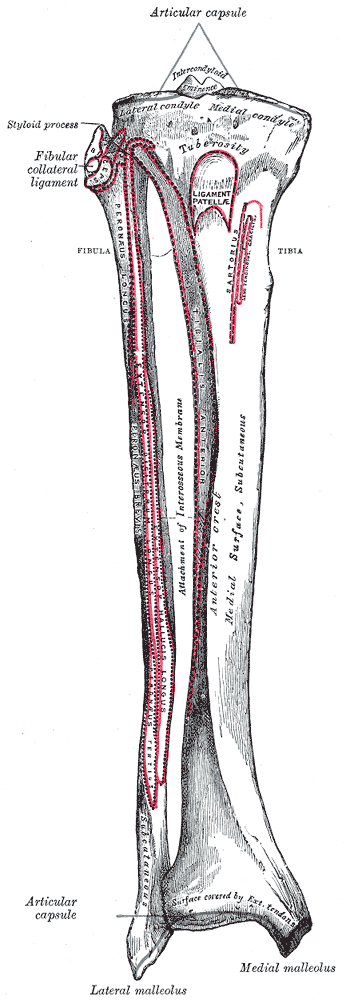
Bones of the right leg, anterior surface.

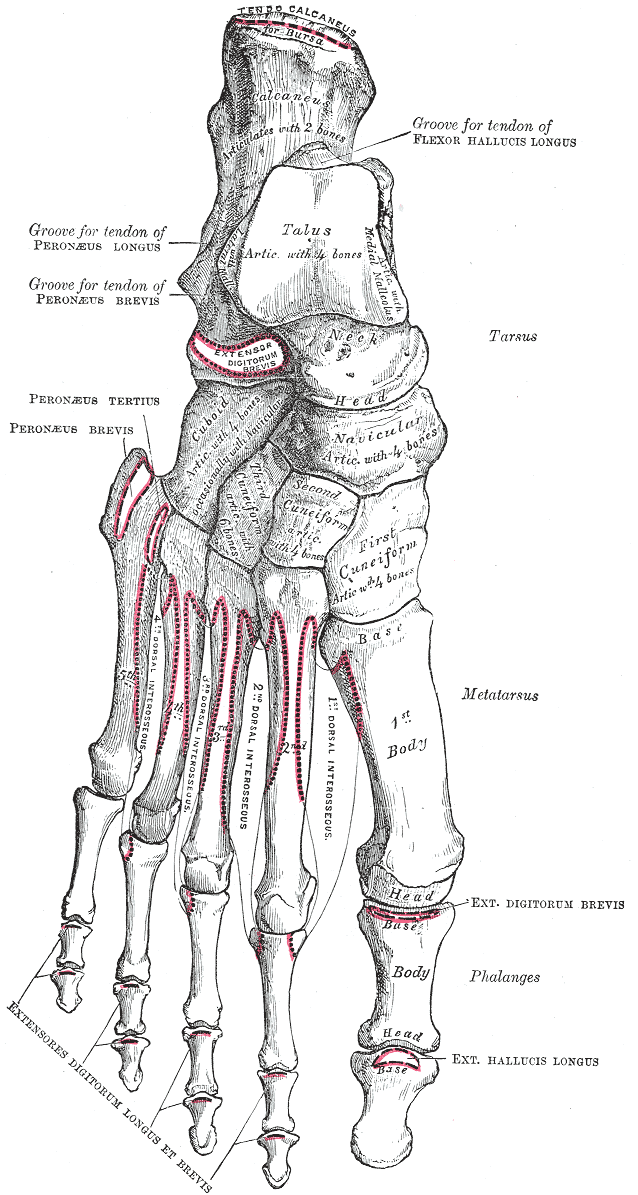
Bones of the right foot, dorsal surface.

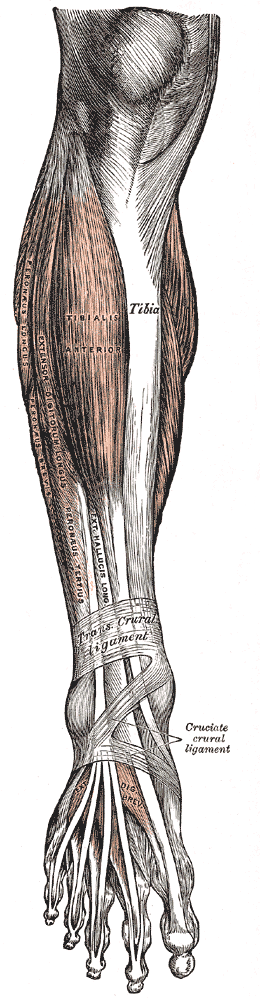
Muscles of the front of the leg.

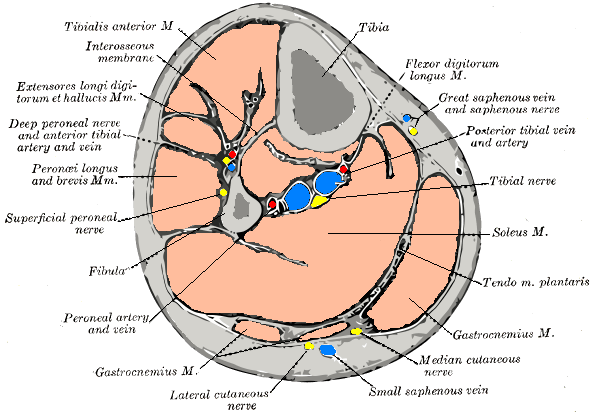
Cross-section through middle of leg.

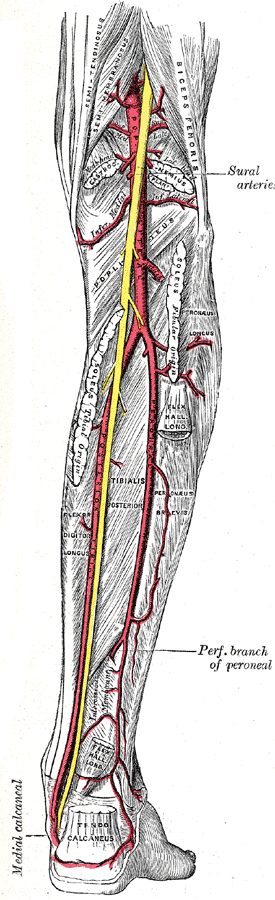
The popliteal, posterior tibial, and fibular arteries.

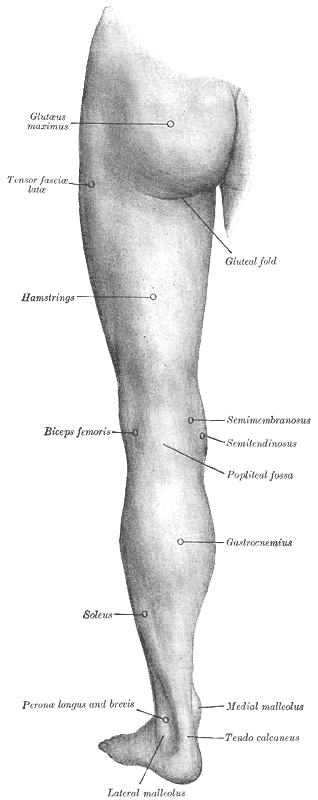
Back of left lower extremity.

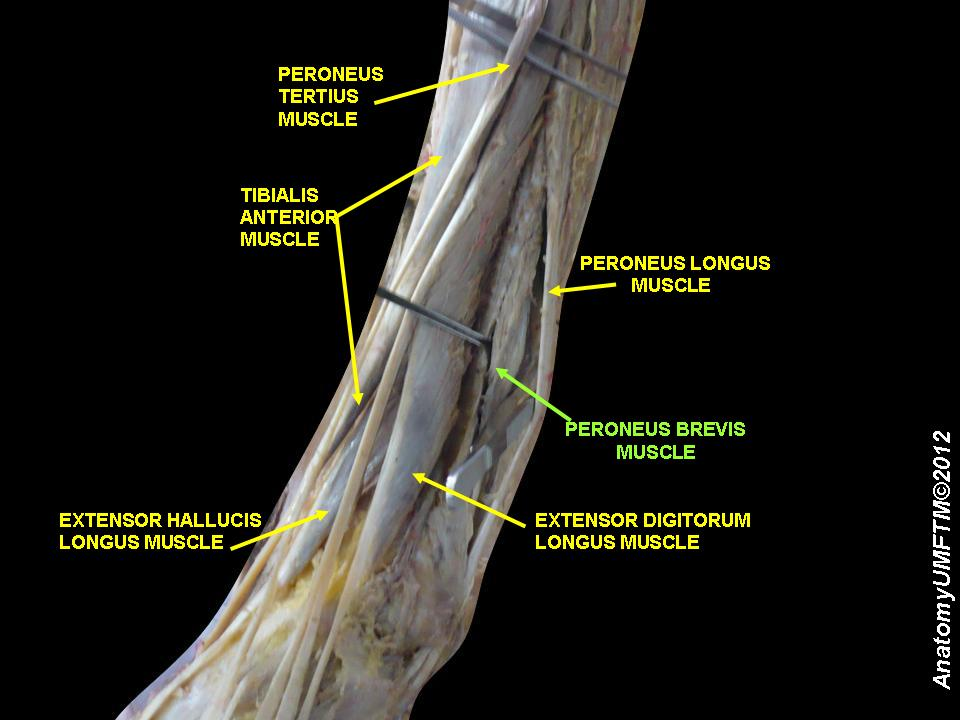
Fibularis brevis muscle

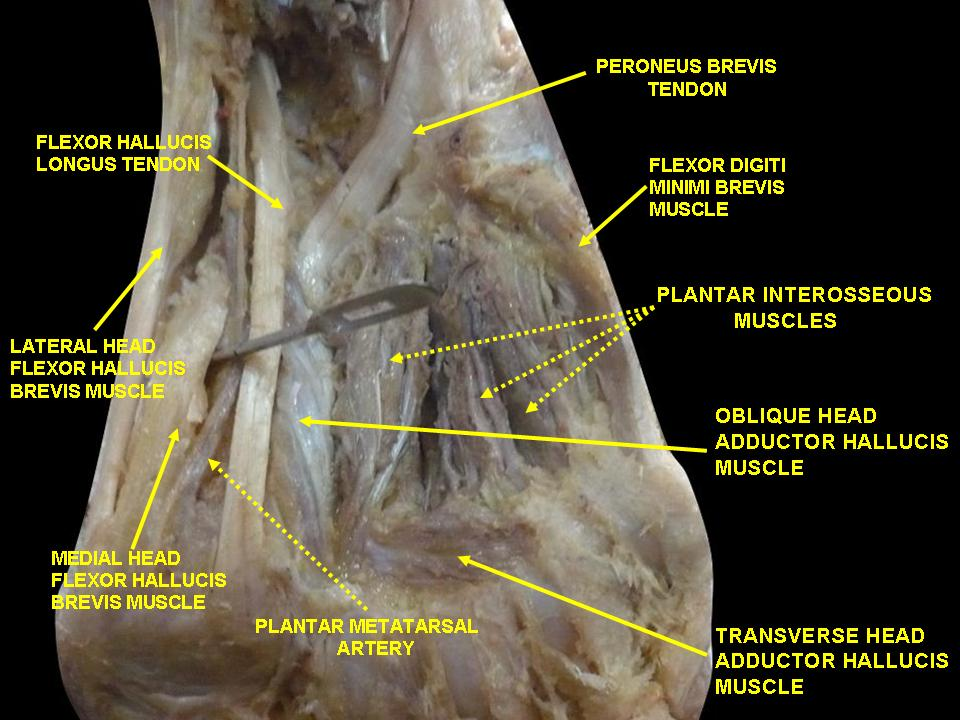
Muscles of the sole of the foot.

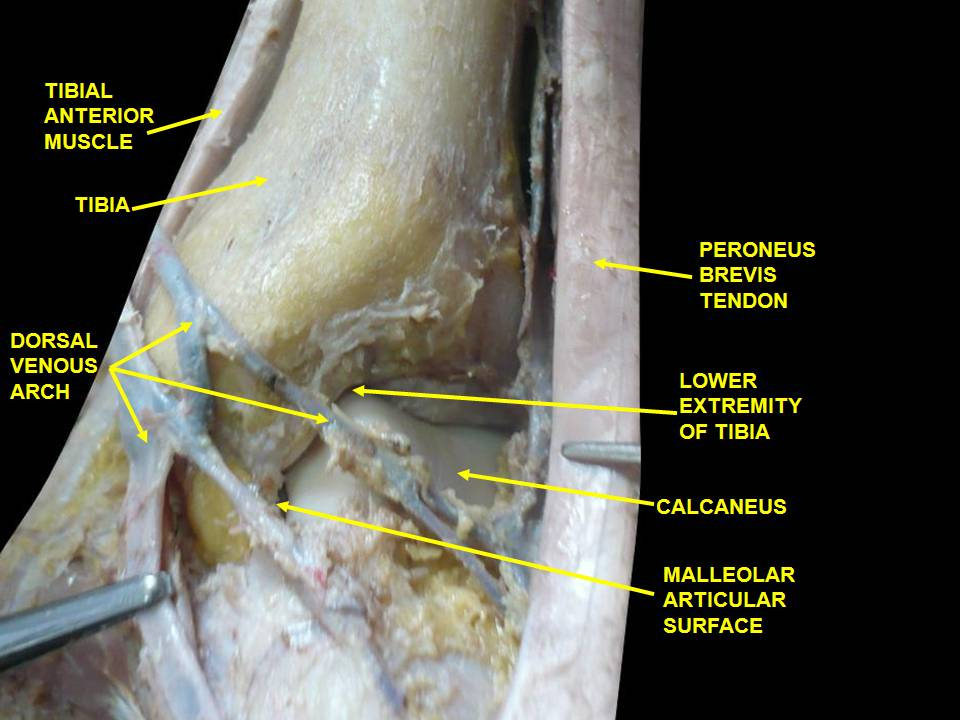
Dorsum of foot, deep dissection.

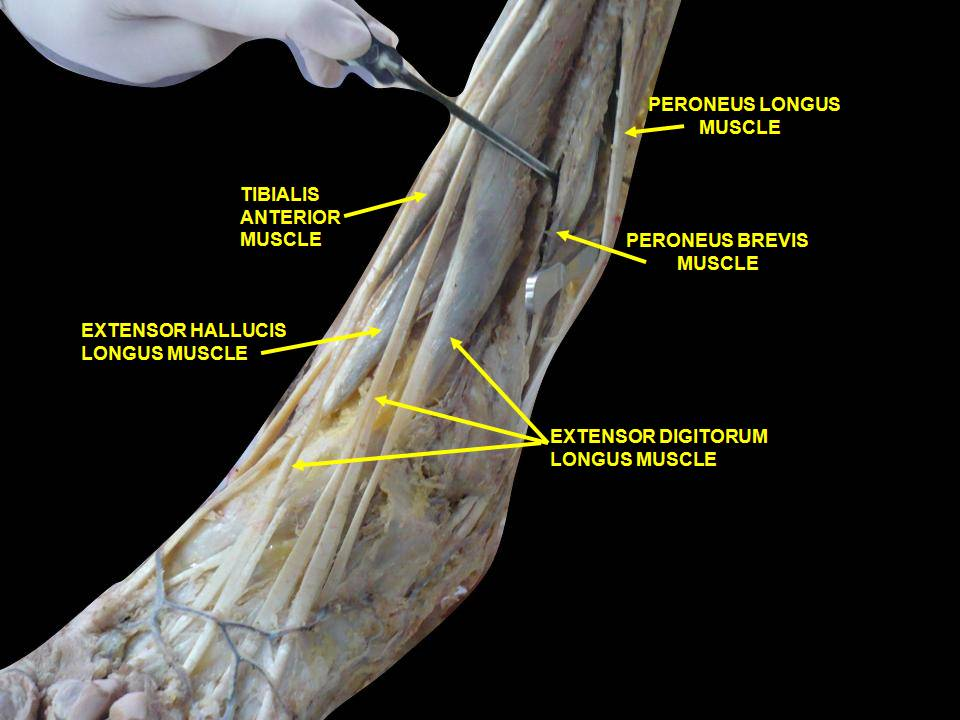
Muscles of leg, lateral view, deep dissection.

== See also ==
- Fibularis muscles
  - Fibularis longus
  - Fibularis tertius
- Schilling tendon procedure
