= Posterior tibial artery =

Blood vessel in the human leg

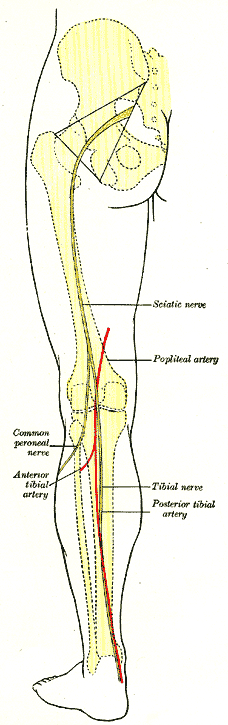
- Back of left lower extremity, showing surface markings for bones, vessels, and nerves (posterior tibial artery labeled at bottom right).

Details
- Source: Popliteal artery
- Branches: Fibular artery, medial plantar artery, lateral plantar artery
- Vein: Posterior tibial vein

Identifiers
- Latin: arteria tibialis posterior
- TA98: A12.2.16.055
- TA2: 4721
- FMA: 43895

The posterior tibial artery of the lower limb is an artery that carries blood to the posterior compartment of the leg and plantar surface of the foot. It branches from the popliteal artery via the tibial-fibular trunk.

== Structure ==
The posterior tibial artery arises from the popliteal artery in the popliteal fossa. It is accompanied by a deep vein, the posterior tibial vein, along its course. It passes just posterior to the medial malleolus of the tibia, but anterior to the Achilles tendon. It passes into the foot deep to the flexor retinaculum of the foot. It runs through the tarsal tunnel.

=== Branches ===
The posterior tibial artery gives rise to:

- medial plantar artery.
- lateral plantar artery.
- fibular artery, which is said to rise from the bifurcation of the tibial-fibular trunk and the posterior tibial artery.
- calcaneal branch to the medial aspect of the calcaneus.

== Function ==
The posterior tibial artery supplies oxygenated blood to the posterior compartment of the leg and the plantar surface of the foot.

== Clinical significance ==
=== Palpation of the posterior tibial artery pulse ===
The posterior tibial artery pulse can be readily palpated halfway between the posterior border of the medial malleolus and the Achilles tendon. It is often examined by clinicians when assessing a patient for peripheral vascular disease. It is very rarely absent in young and healthy individuals. In a study of 547 healthy individuals, seven did not have a palpable posterior tibial artery. It is easily palpated over Pimenta's Point.

=== Nerve block ===
The posterior tibial artery is used as a landmark for the tibial nerve as both structures enter the foot. Local anaesthetic is injected either side of the artery distal to the flexor retinaculum of the foot, close to the calcaneus.

== Additional images ==
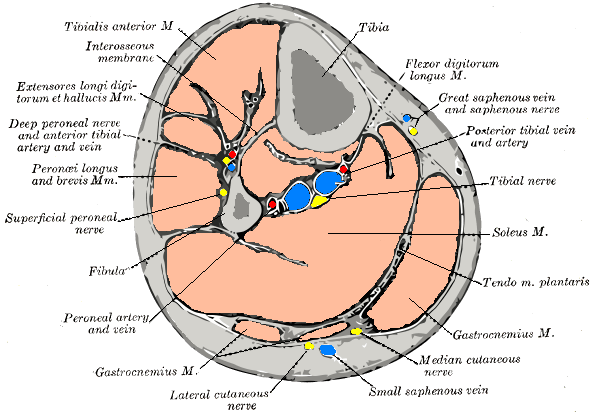
Cross-section through middle of leg.

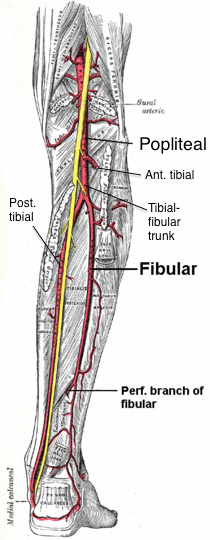
Major arteries of the leg (posterior view).

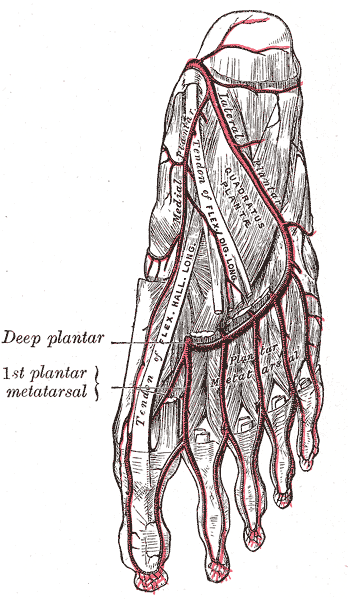
The plantar arteries. Deep view.
