= Fibular retinacula =

Anatomical structure of the ankle

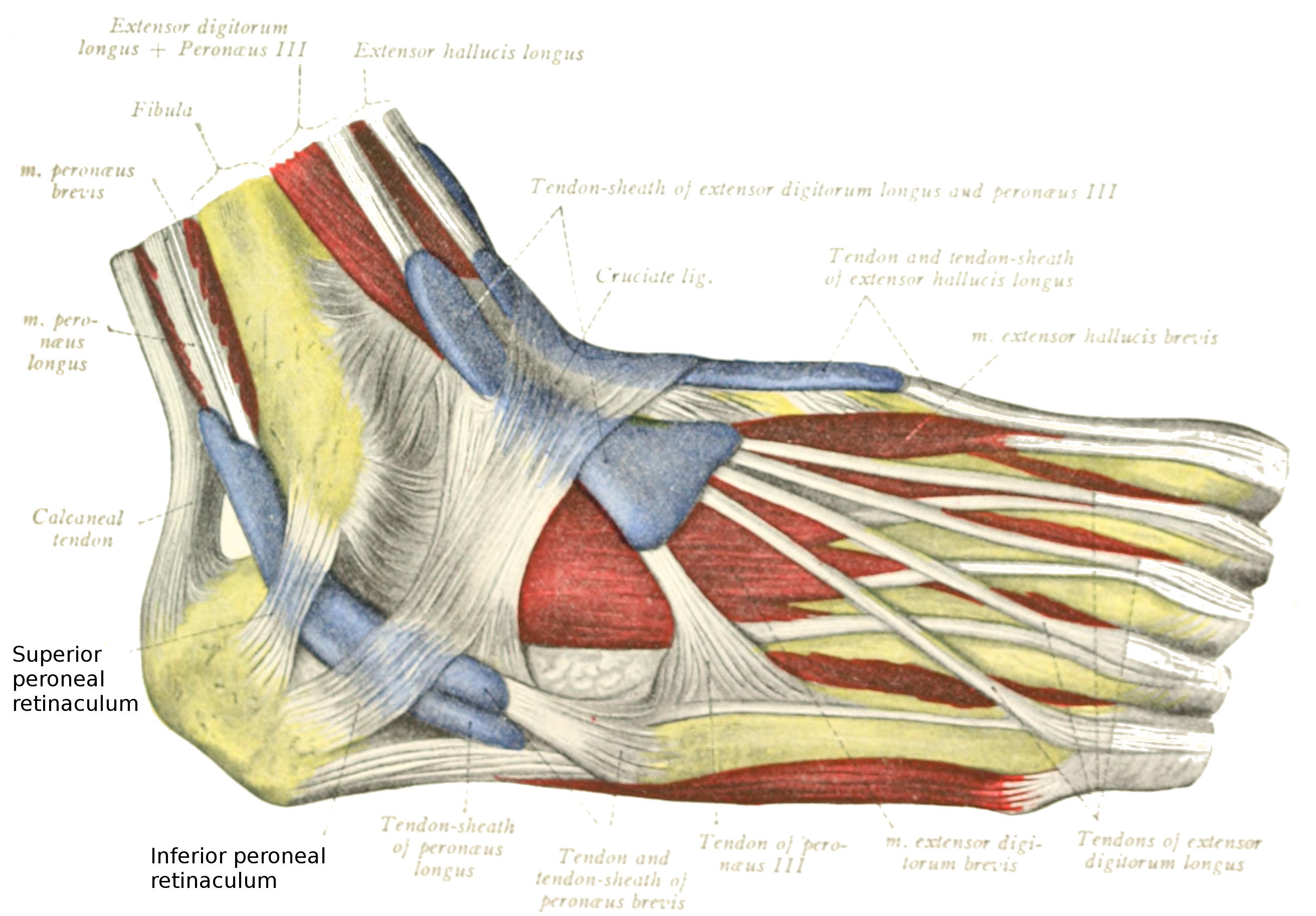
- The mucous sheaths of the tendons around the ankle, lateral aspect.

Details

Identifiers
- Latin: retinacula fibulare

The fibular retinacula (also known as peroneal retinacula) are fibrous retaining bands that bind down the tendons of the fibularis longus and fibularis brevis muscles as they run across the side of the ankle. (Retinaculum is Latin for "retainer.")

These bands consist of the superior fibular retinaculum and the inferior fibular retinaculum.

- Superior fibular retinaculum - the superior fibers are attached above to the lateral malleolus and below to the lateral surface of the calcaneus.
- Inferior fibular retinaculum - the inferior fibers are continuous in front with those of the inferior extensor retinaculum of the foot; behind they are attached to the lateral surface of the calcaneus; some of the fibers are fixed to the calcaneal tubercle, forming a septum between the tendons of the fibularis longus and fibularis brevis.

== See also ==
- Fibularis longus
- Fibularis brevis
