= Flexor digiti minimi brevis muscle of foot =

Muscles of the sole of the foot in the third layer

Flexor digiti minimi brevis muscle
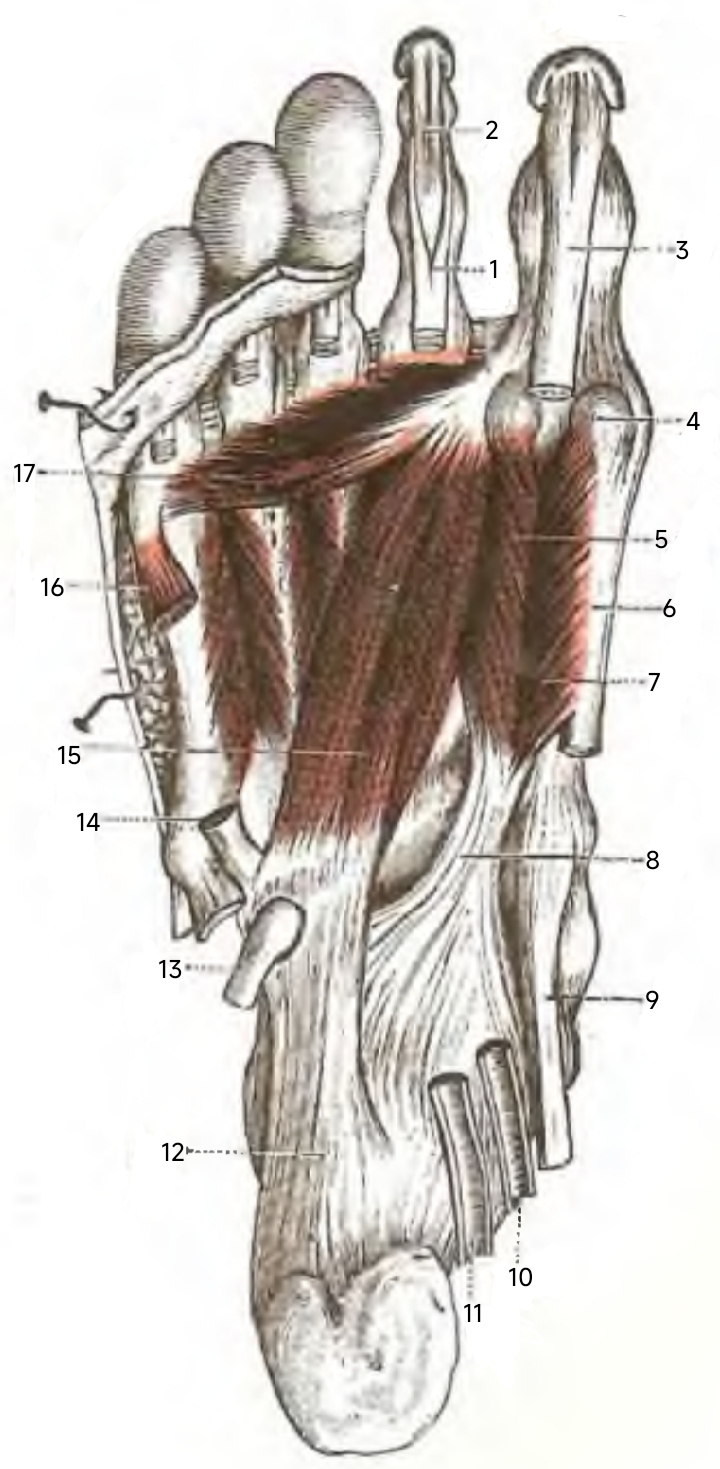
- Muscles of the sole of the foot. Third layer. Flexor dig. quint. brev. labeled 14 & 16 at center right. (After Testut's Anatomy.)

Details
- Origin: Fifth metatarsal bone
- Insertion: First phalanx of the fifth toe
- Nerve: Superficial branch of lateral plantar nerve
- Actions: Flexion and adduction of the fifth toe
- Antagonist: Abductor digiti minimi muscle

Identifiers
- Latin: musculus flexor digiti minimi brevis pedis
- TA98: A04.7.02.066
- TA2: 2682
- FMA: 37455

The flexor digiti minimi brevis (flexor brevis minimi digiti, flexor digiti quinti brevis) lies under the metatarsal bone of the little toe, and resembles one of the interossei.

It originates from the base of the fifth metatarsal bone, and from the sheath of the fibularis longus; its tendon is inserted into the base of the first phalanx of the fifth toe on its lateral side.
