= Fibula =

Leg bone in vertebrates

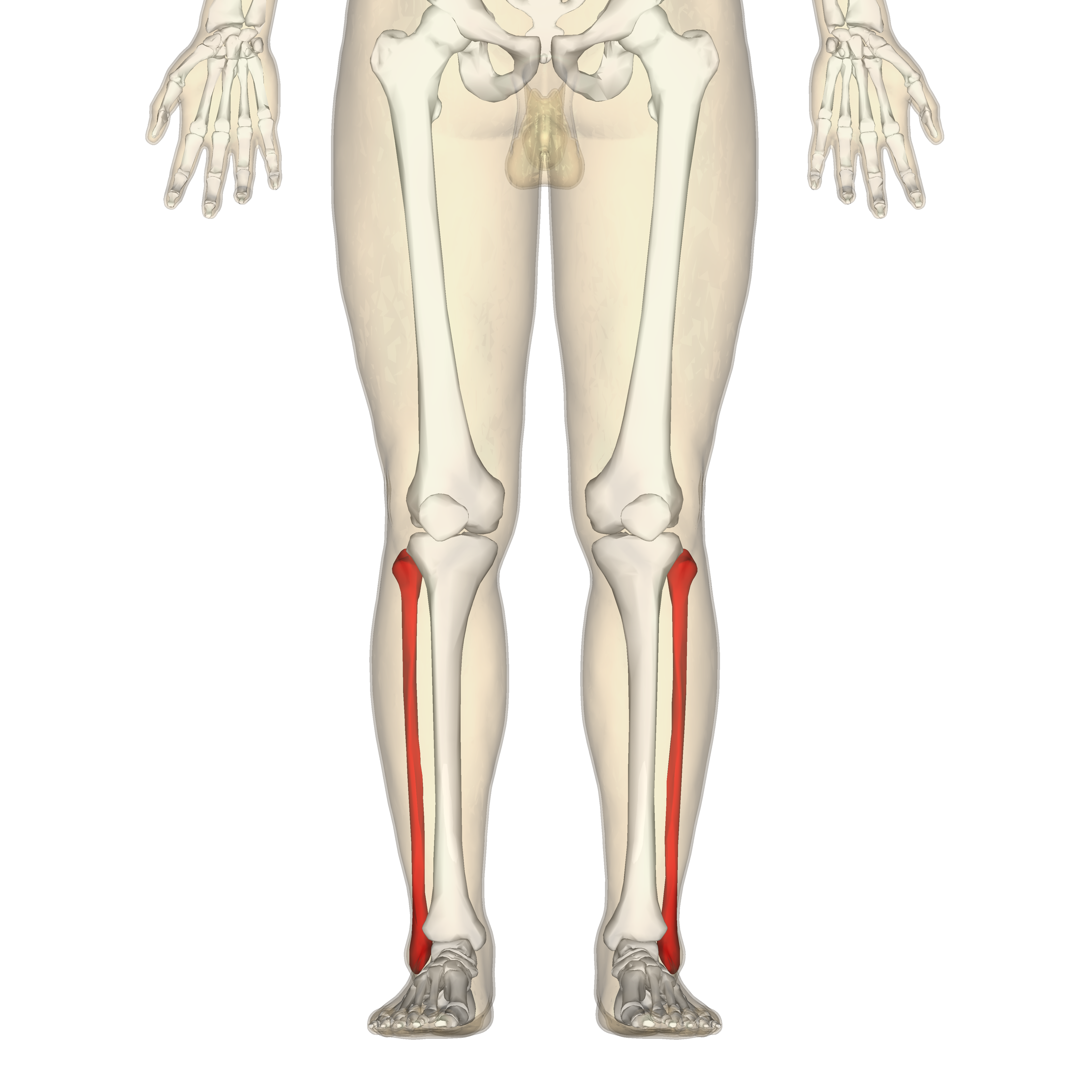
- Position of fibula in human body (shown in red)

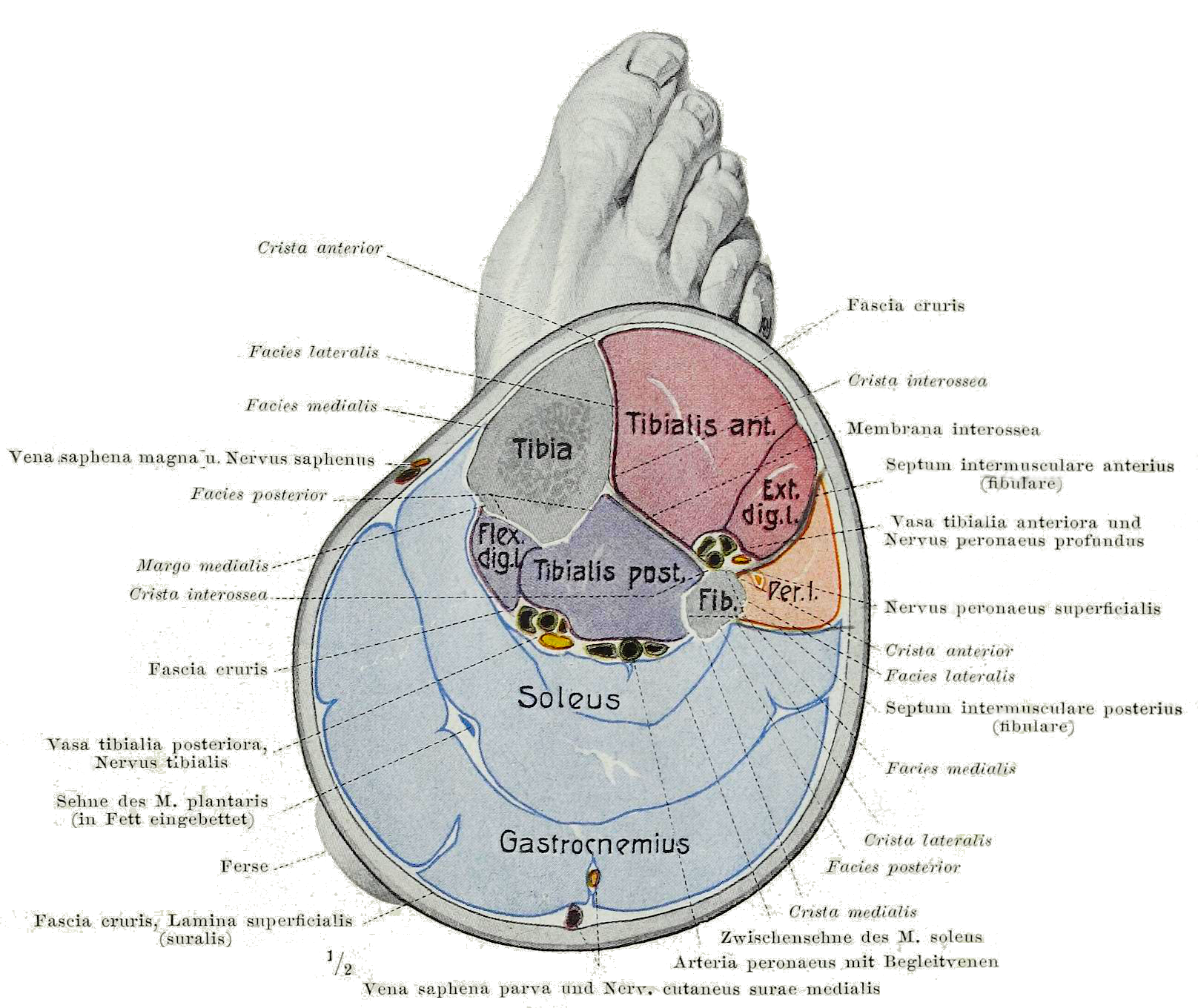
- Cross section of human lower leg, showing fibula near center (terminology in Latin and German)

Details
- Pronunciation: /ˈfɪbjʊlə/
- Articulations: Superior and inferior tibiofibular joint Ankle

Identifiers
- Latin: (os) fibula
- MeSH: D005360
- TA98: A02.5.07.001
- TA2: 1427
- FMA: 24479

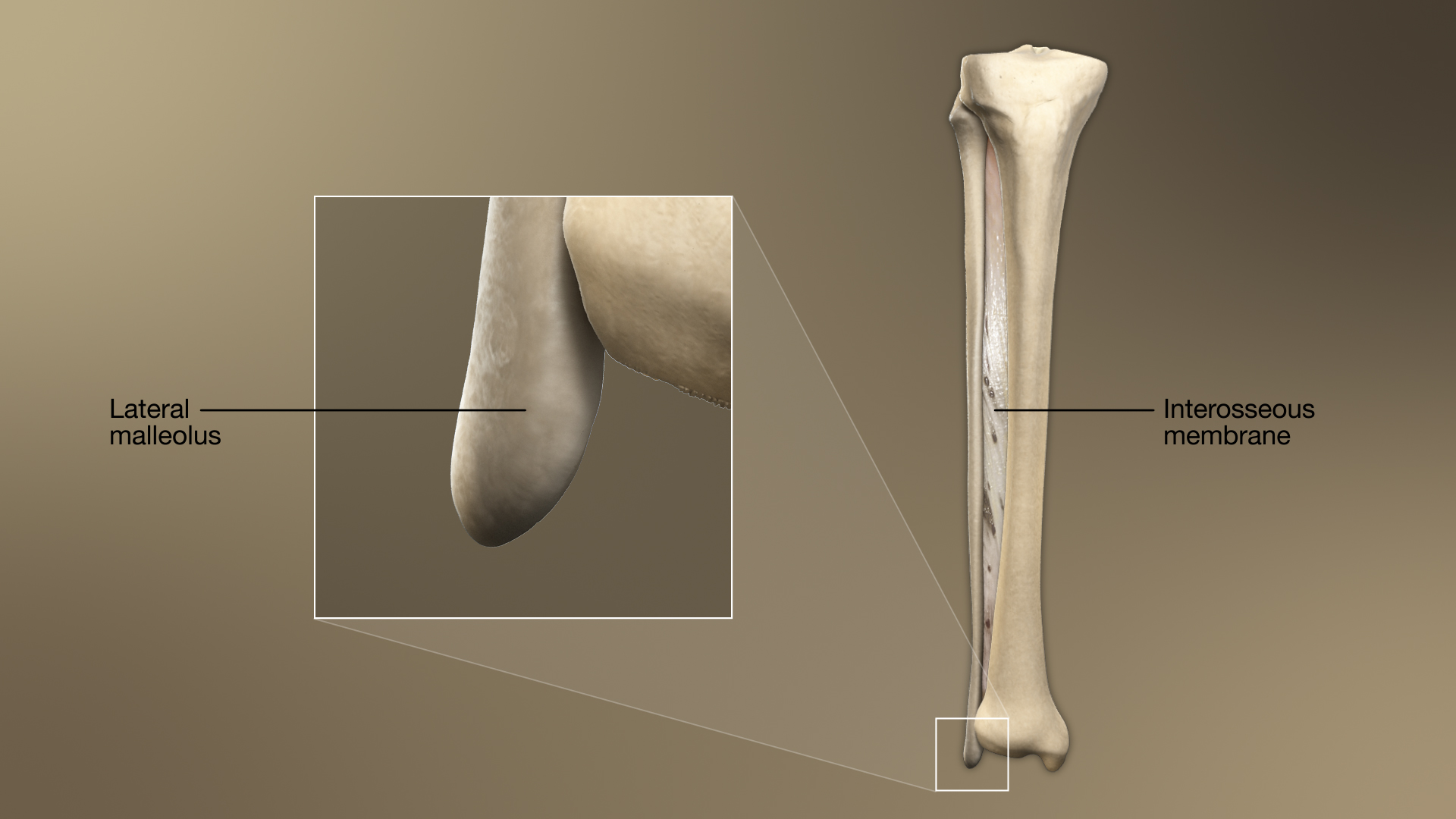
3D medical animation still shot of fibula structure

The fibula (pl.: fibulae or fibulas) or calf bone is a leg bone on the lateral side of the tibia, to which it is connected above and below. It is the smaller of the two bones and, in proportion to its length, the most slender of all the long bones. Its upper extremity is small, placed toward the back of the head of the tibia, below the knee joint and excluded from the formation of this joint. Its lower extremity inclines a little forward, so as to be on a plane anterior to that of the upper end; it projects below the tibia and forms the lateral part of the ankle joint.

== Structure ==
The bone has the following components:

- Lateral malleolus
- Interosseous membrane connecting the fibula to the tibia, forming a syndesmosis joint
- The superior tibiofibular articulation is an arthrodial joint between the lateral condyle of the tibia and the head of the fibula.
- The inferior tibiofibular articulation (tibiofibular syndesmosis) is formed by the rough, convex surface of the medial side of the lower end of the fibula, and a rough concave surface on the lateral side of the tibia.

=== Blood supply ===
The blood supply is important for planning free tissue transfer because the fibula is commonly used to reconstruct the mandible. The shaft is supplied in its middle third by a large nutrient vessel from the fibular artery. It is also perfused from its periosteum which receives many small branches from the fibular artery. The proximal head and the epiphysis are supplied by a branch of the anterior tibial artery. In harvesting the bone the middle third is always taken and the ends preserved (4 cm proximally and 6 cm distally)

=== Development ===
The fibula is ossified from three centers, one for the shaft, and one for either end. Ossification begins in the body about the eighth week of fetal life, and extends toward the extremities. At birth the ends are cartilaginous.

Ossification commences in the lower end in the second year, and in the upper about the fourth year. The lower epiphysis, the first to ossify, unites with the body about the twentieth year; the upper epiphysis joins about the twenty-fifth year.

=== Head ===
The upper extremity or head of the fibula is of an irregular quadrate form, presenting above a flattened articular surface, directed upward, forward, and medialward, for articulation with a corresponding surface on the lateral condyle of the tibia. On the lateral side is a thick and rough prominence continued behind into a pointed eminence, the apex (styloid process), which projects upward from the posterior part of the head.

The prominence, at its upper and lateral part, gives attachment to the tendon of the biceps femoris and to the fibular collateral ligament of the knee-joint, the ligament dividing the tendon into two parts.

The remaining part of the circumference of the head is rough, for the attachment of muscles and ligaments. It presents in front a tubercle for the origin of the upper and anterior fibers of the peroneus longus, and a surface for the attachment of the anterior ligament of the head; and behind, another tubercle, for the attachment of the posterior ligament of the head and the origin of the upper fibers of the soleus.

=== Body ===
The body of the fibula presents four borders - the antero-lateral, the antero-medial, the postero-lateral, and the postero-medial; and four surfaces - anterior, posterior, medial, and lateral.

Borders

The antero-lateral border begins above in front of the head, runs vertically downward to a little below the middle of the bone, and then curving somewhat lateralward, bifurcates so as to embrace a triangular subcutaneous surface immediately above the lateral malleolus. This border gives attachment to an intermuscular septum, which separates the extensor muscles on the anterior surface of the leg from the peronaei longus and brevis on the lateral surface.

The antero-medial border, or interosseous crest, is situated close to the medial side of the preceding, and runs nearly parallel with it in the upper third of its extent, but diverges from it in the lower two-thirds. It begins above just beneath the head of the bone (sometimes it is quite indistinct for about 2.5 cm. below the head), and ends at the apex of a rough triangular surface immediately above the articular facet of the lateral malleolus. It serves for the attachment of the interosseous membrane, which separates the extensor muscles in front from the flexor muscles behind.

The postero-lateral border is prominent; it begins above at the apex, and ends below in the posterior border of the lateral malleolus. It is directed lateralward above, backward in the middle of its course, backward, and a little medialward below, and gives attachment to an aponeurosis which separates the peronaei on the lateral surface from the flexor muscles on the posterior surface.

The postero-medial border, sometimes called the oblique line, begins above at the medial side of the head, and ends by becoming continuous with the interosseous crest at the lower fourth of the bone. It is well-marked and prominent at the upper and middle parts of the bone. It gives attachment to an aponeurosis which separates the tibialis posterior from the soleus and flexor hallucis longus.

Surfaces

The anterior surface is the interval between the antero-lateral and antero-medial borders. It is extremely narrow and flat in the upper third of its extent; broader and grooved longitudinally in its lower third; it serves for the origin of three muscles: the extensor digitorum longus, extensor hallucis longus, and peroneus tertius.

The posterior surface is the space included between the postero-lateral and the postero-medial borders; it is continuous below with the triangular area above the articular surface of the lateral malleolus; it is directed backward above, backward and medialward at its middle, directly medialward below. Its upper third is rough, for the origin of the soleus; its lower part presents a triangular surface, connected to the tibia by a strong interosseous ligament; the intervening part of the surface is covered by the fibers of origin of the flexor hallucis longus. Near the middle of this surface is the nutrient foramen, which is directed downward.

The medial surface is the interval included between the antero-medial and the postero-medial borders. It is grooved for the origin of the tibialis posterior.

The lateral surface is the space between the antero-lateral and postero-lateral borders. It is broad, and often deeply grooved; it is directed lateralward in the upper two-thirds of its course, backward in the lower third, where it is continuous with the posterior border of the lateral malleolus. This surface gives origin to the peronaei longus and brevis.

Position of fibula (shown in red)

3D image

Shape of fibula (right)

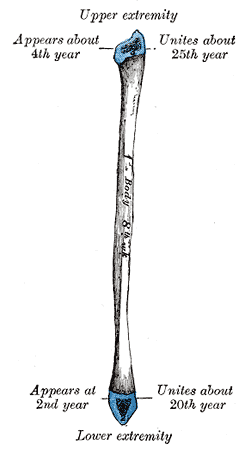
Diagram which depicts ossification of human fibula.

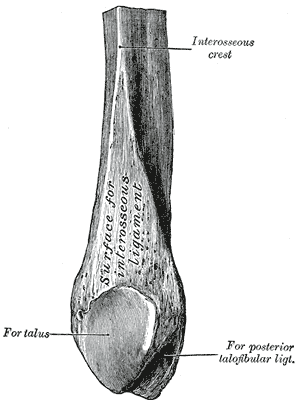
Lower extremity of right fibula. Medial aspect.

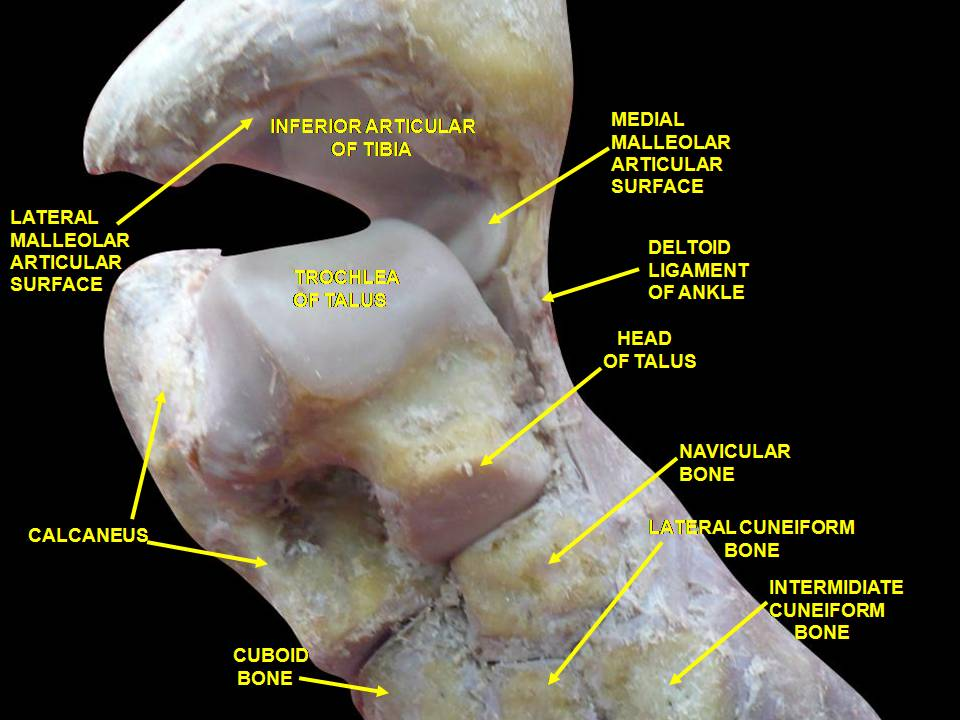
Ankle joint. Deep dissection.

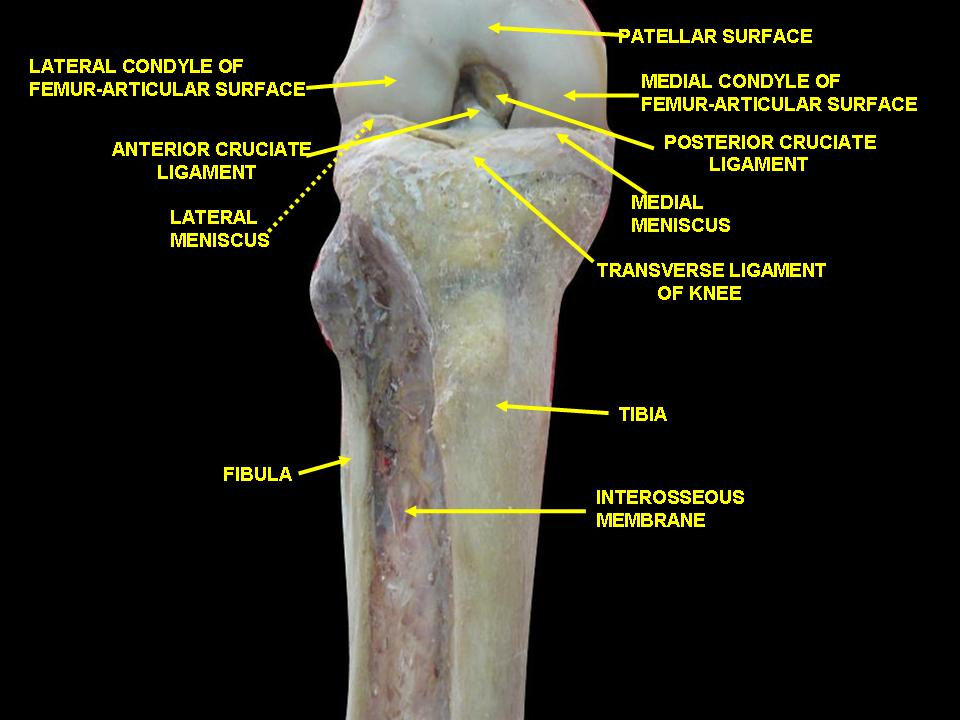
Knee and tibiofibular joint. Deep dissection. Anterior view.

Fibula anatomy

== Function ==
The fibula does not carry any significant load (weight) of the body. It extends past the lower end of the tibia and forms the outer part of the ankle providing stability to this joint. It has a groove (a depression) for certain ligaments which gives them leverage and multiplies the muscle force. It provides attachment points for the following muscles:

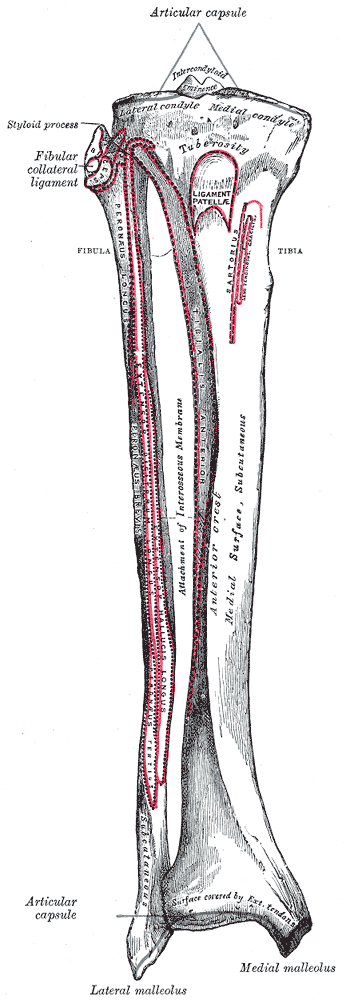
Muscle attachments (seen from the front)

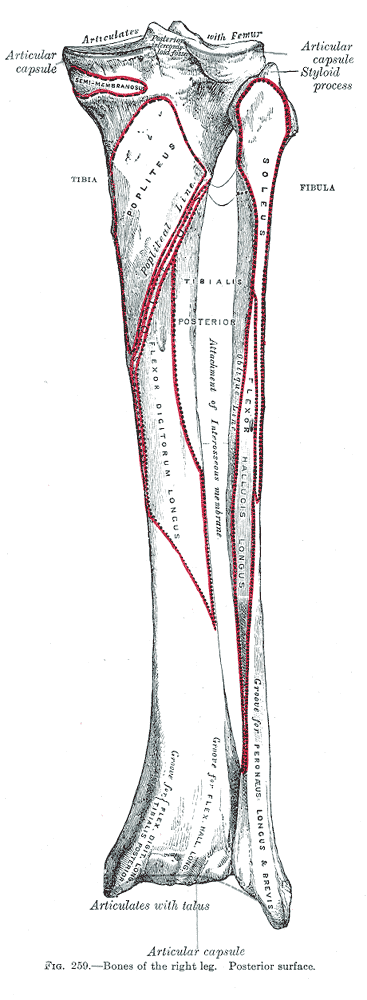
Muscle attachments (seen from the back)

Muscle	Direction	Attachment
Biceps femoris muscle	Insertion	Head of fibula
Extensor hallucis longus muscle	Origin	Medial side of fibula
Extensor digitorum longus muscle	Origin	Proximal part of the medial side of fibula
Fibularis tertius	Origin	Distal part of the medial side of fibula
Fibularis longus	Origin	Head and the lateral side of fibula
Fibularis brevis	Origin	Distal 2/3 of the lateral side of fibula
Soleus muscle	Origin	Proximal 1/3 of the posterior side of fibula
Tibialis posterior muscle	Origin	Lateral part of the posterior side of fibula
Flexor hallucis longus muscle	Origin	Posterior side of fibula

== Clinical significance ==
As much of the fibula can be removed without it impacting an individual's ability to walk, the fibula is utilised as a source of bone material in fibular free flap surgeries.

=== Fractures ===
The most common type of fibula fracture is located at the distal end of the bone, and is classified as ankle fracture. In the Danis–Weber classification it has three categories:

- Type A: Fracture of the lateral malleolus, distal to the syndesmosis (the connection between the distal ends of the tibia and fibula).
- Type B: Fracture of the fibula at the level of the syndesmosis
- Type C: Fracture of the fibula proximal to the syndesmosis.

A Maisonneuve fracture is a spiral fracture of the proximal third of the fibula associated with a tear of the distal tibiofibular syndesmosis and the interosseous membrane. There is an associated fracture of the medial malleolus or rupture of the deep deltoid ligament.

An avulsion fracture of the head of the fibula refers to the fracture of the fibular head because of a sudden contraction of the biceps femoris muscle that pulls its site of attachment on the bone. The attachment of the biceps femoris tendon on the fibular head is closely related to the lateral collateral ligament of the knee. Therefore, this ligament is prone to injury in this type of avulsion fracture.

== History ==
=== Etymology ===
The word fibula can be dated back to c. 1670. It derives from Latin fībula, which describes a clasp or brooch – see fibula (brooch) – and was first used in English for the smaller bone in the lower leg c. 1706. The bone was so called because it resembles a clasp like a modern safety pin.

The adjective peroneal referring to the fibula bone or its surrounding structures derives from περόνη : perónē, the Ancient Greek word for a clasp.

== Other animals ==
Because the fibula bears relatively little weight in comparison with the tibia, it is typically narrower in all but the most primitive tetrapods. In many animals, it still articulates with the posterior part of the lower extremity of the femur, but this feature is frequently lost (as it is in humans). In some animals, the reduction of the fibula has proceeded even further than it has in humans, with the loss of the tarsal articulation, and, in extreme cases (such as the horse), partial fusion with the tibia.

== See also ==
- Fibular hemimelia — congenital absence or shortening of the fibula
- Peroneal
