= Lateral compartment of leg =

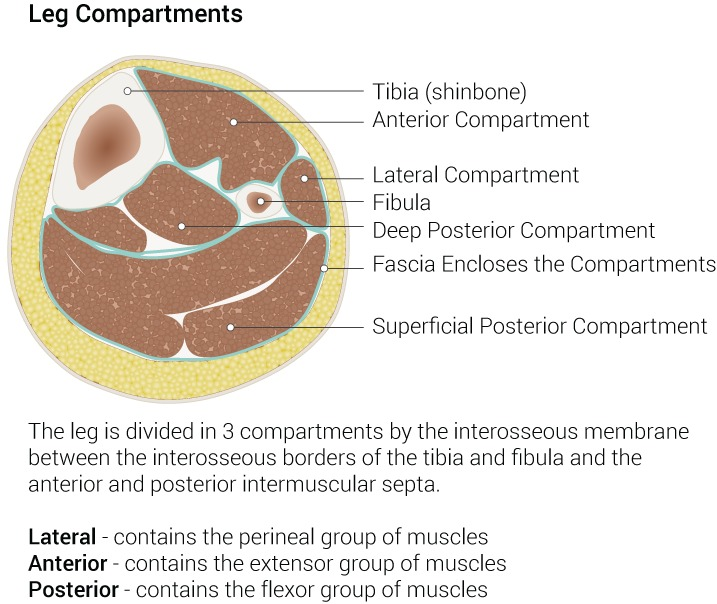
- Diagram of leg compartments
- Dissection video of lateral compartment of leg (1 min 9 sec)

Details
- Artery: Fibular artery
- Nerve: Superficial fibular nerve

Identifiers
- Latin: compartimentum cruris laterale
- TA98: A04.7.01.009
- TA2: 2651
- FMA: 45185

The lateral compartment of the leg is a fascial compartment of the lower leg. It contains muscles which make eversion and plantarflexion of the foot.

== Muscles ==
The lateral compartment of the leg contains:

- Fibularis longus
- Fibularis brevis

Image	Muscle	Origin	Insertion	Innervation	Main Action
	Fibularis longus	Head and superior two thirds of lateral surface of fibula	Base of 1st metatarsal and medial cuneiform	Superficial fibular nerve (L5, S1, S2)	Everts foot and weakly plantarflexes ankle
	Fibularis brevis	Inferior two thirds of lateral surface of fibula	Dorsal surface of tuberosity on lateral side of base of 5th metatarsal	Superficial fibular nerve (L5, S1, S2)	Everts foot and weakly plantarflexes ankle

== Action ==
- Foot evertors
- Foot plantarflexion

== Nerve supply ==
The lateral compartment of the leg is supplied by the superficial fibular nerve (superficial peroneal nerve).

== Blood supply ==
Its proximal and distal arterial supply consists of perforating branches of the anterior tibial artery and fibular artery.

== Additional images ==
Animation. Fibularis longus (blue) and fibularis brevis (red).

== See also ==
- Fascial compartments of leg
