= Fibular artery =

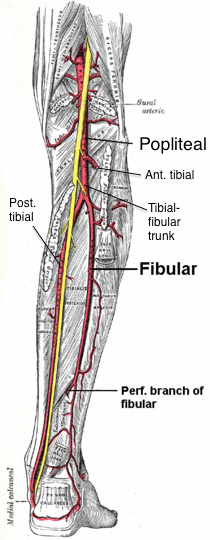
- Posterior view of the arteries of the lower limb, showing fibular artery and its source, the tibial-fibular trunk. The perforating branch of fibular artery is also shown.

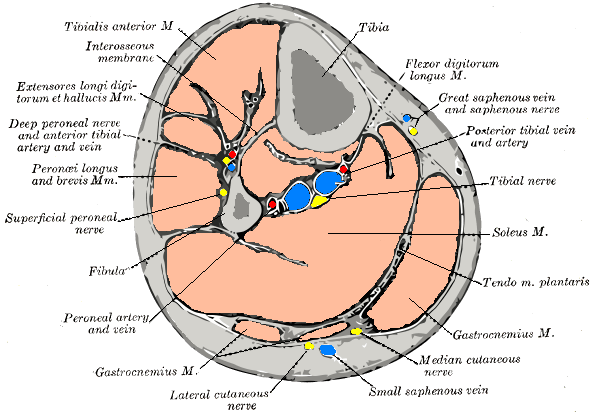
- Cross-section through middle of leg. (Fibular artery labeled as Peroneal at bottom right.)

Details
- Source: Usually tibial-fibular trunk, occasionally popliteal artery
- Branches: Communicating branch (to the anterior tibial artery) and the perforating branch (to the posterior tibial artery)
- Vein: Fibular vein
- Supplies: Lateral compartment of the leg

Identifiers
- Latin: arteria fibularis, arteria peronea
- TA98: A12.2.16.071
- TA2: 4727
- FMA: 43921

In anatomy, the fibular artery, also known as the peroneal artery, supplies blood to the lateral compartment of the leg. It arises from the tibial-fibular trunk.

== Structure ==
The fibular artery arises from the bifurcation of tibial-fibular trunk into the fibular and posterior tibial arteries in the upper part of the leg proper, just below the knee. It runs towards the foot in the deep posterior compartment of the leg, just medial to the fibula. It supplies a perforating branch to both the lateral and anterior compartments of the leg; it also provides a nutrient artery to the fibula. Some sources claim that the fibular artery arises directly from the posterior tibial artery, but vascular and plastic surgeons note the clinical significance of the tibial-fibular trunk.

The fibular artery is accompanied by small veins (venae comitantes) known as fibular veins.

=== Branches ===
Communication branch to posterior tibial artery.

Perforating branch to anterior lateral malleolar artery.

A calcaneal branch to the lateral part of the calcaneus.

== Nomenclature ==
At one point in its history, both the Greek term perone and the Latin term fibula were competing to describe the smaller bone of the leg. Many of the arteries, veins, nerves, and muscles in the leg are named according to what bone they are near (e.g. tibialis anterior and the tibial nerve are near the tibia). So the artery that runs near the smaller leg bone had two names: the peroneal artery and the fibular artery. The term fibula eventually became the standard name for the bone, but many of the related arteries, muscles, and nerves are still called by the Greek derived name peroneal. The Terminologia Anatomica, the international standard for anatomical nomenclature, states that both fibula and perone derived names are acceptable, but lists the fibula derived names as the preferred terms.

Like fibula, the perone (pronounced pair-uh-knee) means pin of a brooch or buckle.

== Additional images ==
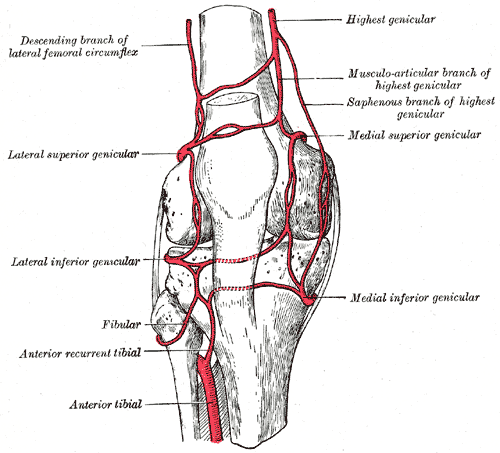
Circumpatellar anastomosis.
