= Genicular arteries =

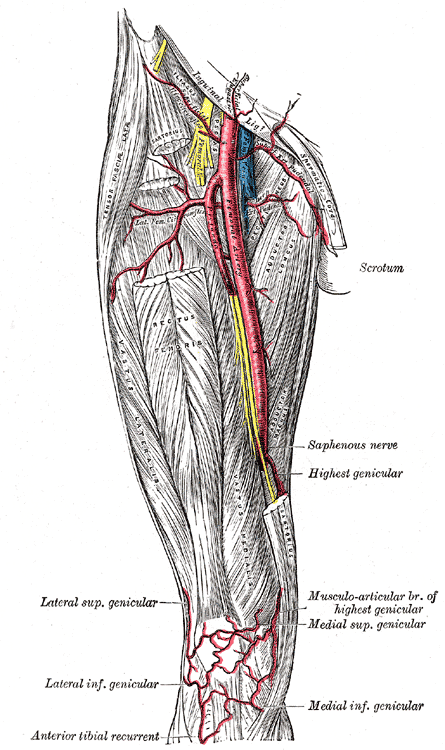
- The genicular arteries

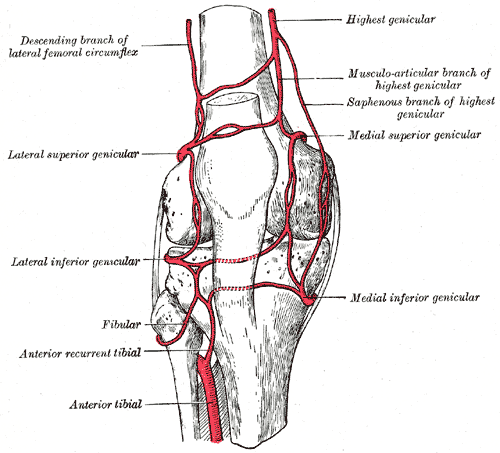
- The genicular anastomosis

The genicular arteries (from Latin geniculum, "knee") are six arteries in the human leg, five of which are branches of the popliteal artery, that anastomose in the knee region in the patellar network or genicular anastomosis. They supply blood to the patella, together with contributions from the descending genicular artery, anterior tibial recurrent artery, and descending branch of lateral circumflex femoral artery.

The descending genicular artery also known as the highest genicular artery is the only genicular artery to arise from the femoral artery and has the most superior or proximal origin of all six genicular arteries.

== Popliteal branches ==
Five genicular arteries branch from the popliteal artery to form a network around the knee, the genicular anastomosis. The anastomosis provides collateral circulation in the event of damage to the region. Inferior or distal to the origin of the descending genicular artery are two superior genicular arteries:

- Medial superior genicular artery
- Lateral superior genicular artery

The middle genicular artery is a small branch of the popliteal artery that originates inferior or distal to both the superior genicular arteries as well as the sural arteries.

Inferior or distal to the origins of the superior and middle genicular arteries are the two inferior genicular arteries:

- Medial inferior genicular artery
- Lateral inferior genicular artery

== Femoral branch ==
The descending genicular artery is the only one to branch from the femoral artery.
