= Inferior artery =

Inferior artery may refer to

- Inferior alveolar artery
- Inferior hypophysial artery
- Inferior epigastric artery
- Inferior genicular arteries
- Inferior gluteal artery
- Inferior labial artery
- Inferior laryngeal artery
- Inferior lateral genicular artery
- Inferior medial genicular artery
- Inferior mesenteric artery
- Inferior pancreaticoduodenal artery
- Inferior phrenic arteries
- Inferior rectal artery
- Inferior suprarenal artery
- Inferior thyroid artery
- Inferior tympanic artery
- Inferior vesical artery
