= Achilles' heel =

Critical weakness which can lead to downfall despite overall strength

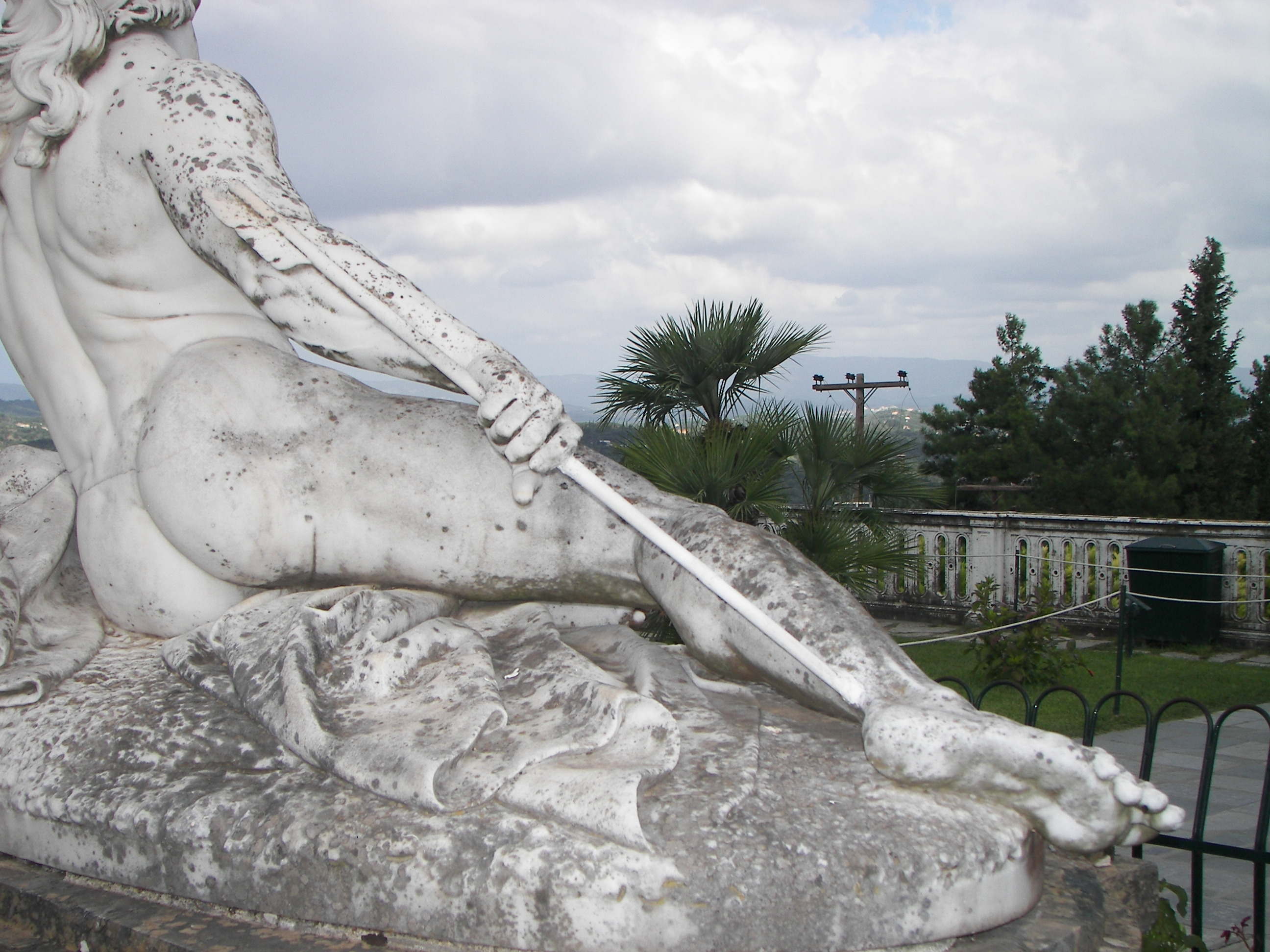
Statue of Achilleas Thniskon (Dying Achilles) at the Corfu Achilleion.

An Achilles' heel (or Achilles heel) is a weakness despite overall strength, which can lead to downfall. While the mythological origin refers to a physical vulnerability, idiomatic references to other attributes or qualities that can lead to downfall are common.

== The classical myth ==
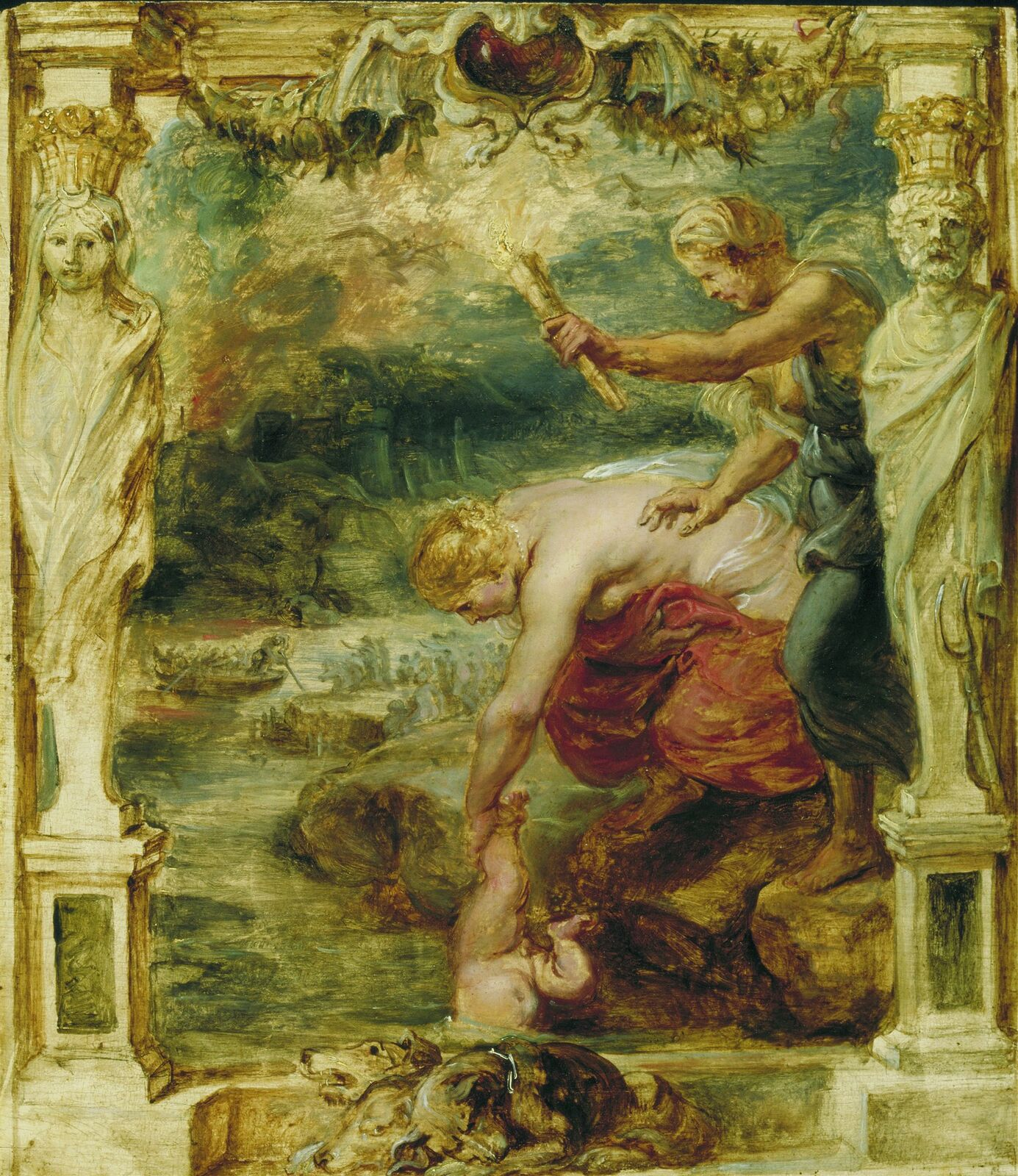
Oil painting (c. 1625) by Peter Paul Rubens of the goddess Thetis dipping her son Achilles in the River Styx, which runs through Hades. In the background, the ferryman Charon rows the dead across the river in his boat.

Although the death of Achilles was predicted by Hector in Homer's Iliad, it does not actually occur in the Iliad, but was described in later Greek and Roman poetry and drama concerning events after the Iliad, later in the Trojan War. In the myths surrounding the war, Achilles was said to have died from a wound to his heel, ankle, or torso, which was the result of an arrow—possibly poisoned—shot by Paris. The Iliad may have purposefully suppressed the myth to emphasise Achilles' human mortality and the stark chasm between gods and heroes.

Some later Hellenistic-era myths record Thetis trying to make her son immortal by anointing him with ambrosia and burning away his mortality in the hearth fire, but Peleus, his father, discovered the treatment and was alarmed to see Thetis holding the baby in the flames, which disrupted the ritual and thus made Thetis leave the treatment incomplete, rendering their son as vulnerable as Sigurd. According to a myth arising later, his mother had dipped the infant Achilles in the river Styx, holding onto him by his heel, and he became invulnerable where the waters touched him –that is, everywhere except the areas of his heel that were covered by her thumb and forefinger. According to recent research, the sources mentioning the myth refers to the talus (the Greek astragalos) as vulnerable point.

== As expression ==
As an expression meaning "area of weakness, vulnerable spot", the use of "Achilles' heel" dates only to 1840, with implied use in Samuel Taylor Coleridge's "Ireland, that vulnerable heel of the British Achilles!" from 1810 (Oxford English Dictionary).

== Anatomy ==
The large and prominent tendon of the gastrocnemius, soleus, and plantaris muscles of the calf is called the tendo achilleus or Achilles tendon. This is commonly associated with the site of Achilles's death wound. The oldest-known written record of the name is in 1693 by the Flemish/Dutch anatomist Philip Verheyen. In his widely used text Corporis Humani Anatomia he described the tendon's location and said that it was commonly called "the cord of Achilles". Tendons are avascular, so such an injury would be unlikely to be fatal if the arrow were not poisoned.

== See also ==
- Ferdiad – A character in the Ulster cycle impervious to weapons with the exception of his anus
- Kryptonite – Fictional element from Superman stories
- Single point of failure – Component whose failure will disrupt the entire system
- Squatting position – Human posture
