= Superior artery =

Superior artery may refer to

- Anterior superior alveolar arteries
- Posterior superior alveolar artery
- Superior alveolar artery (disambiguation)
- Superior cerebellar artery
- Superior epigastric artery
- Superior genicular arteries
- Superior gluteal artery
- Superior hypophysial artery
- Superior labial artery
- Superior laryngeal artery
- Superior lateral genicular artery
- Superior medial genicular artery
- Superior mesenteric artery
- Superior pancreaticoduodenal artery
- Superior phrenic arteries
- Superior rectal artery
- Superior thoracic artery
- Superior thyroid artery
- Superior suprarenal artery
- Superior tympanic artery
- Superior vesical artery
