= Popliteal =

Popliteal refers to anatomical structures located in the back of the knee:

- Popliteal artery
- Popliteal vein
- Popliteal fossa
- Popliteal lymph nodes
- Popliteus muscle
- Popliteal nerves
- Popliteal pterygium syndrome
