= Popliteal ligament =

Popliteal ligament may refer to:

- Arcuate popliteal ligament
- Oblique popliteal ligament
