= Popliteal lymph nodes =

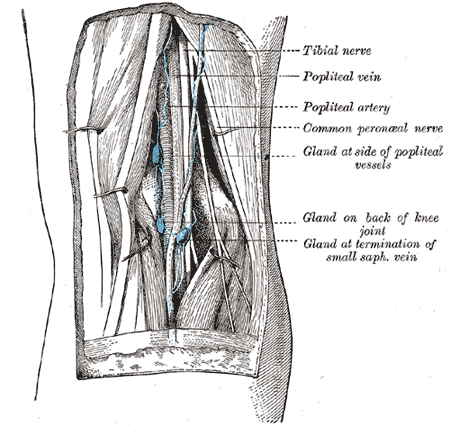
- Lymph glands of popliteal fossa.

- Regional lymph tissue

Details
- System: Lymphatic system
- Drains to: Deep inguinal lymph nodes

Identifiers
- Latin: nodi lymphoidei poplitei
- FMA: 44227

The popliteal lymph nodes, small in size and some six or seven in number, are embedded in the fat contained in the popliteal fossa, sometimes referred to as the 'knee pit'. One lies immediately beneath the popliteal fascia, near the terminal part of the small saphenous vein, and drains the region from which this vein derives its tributaries, such as superficial regions of the posterolateral aspect of the leg and the plantar aspect of the foot.

Another is between the popliteal artery and the posterior surface of the knee-joint. It receives afferents from the knee-joint, together with those that accompany the genicular arteries. The others lie at the sides of the popliteal vessels, and receive, as efferents, the trunks that accompany the anterior and posterior tibial vessels.

The efferents of the popliteal lymph nodes pass almost entirely alongside the femoral vessels to the deep inguinal lymph nodes, but a few may accompany the great saphenous vein, and end in the glands of the superficial subinguinal group. The flow of lymph from the legs towards the heart is the result of the calf pump– during walking the calf muscle contracts, squeezing lymph out of the leg via the lymphatic vessels. When the muscle relaxes, valves in the vessels shut preventing the fluid from returning to the lower extremities.
