= Sural arteries =

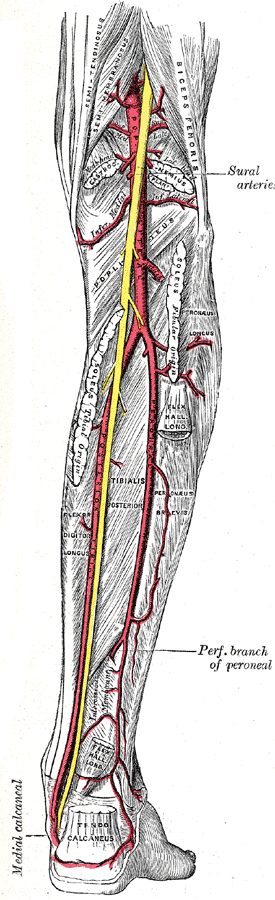
- The popliteal, posterior tibial, and peroneal arteries (sural arteries labeled at upper right)

Details
- Source: Popliteal artery

Identifiers
- Latin: arteriae surales
- TA98: A12.2.16.037
- TA2: 4703
- FMA: 22570

The sural arteries (inferior muscular arteries) are two large branches, lateral and medial, which are distributed to the gastrocnemius, soleus, and plantaris muscles. Sural means related to the calf. The term applies to any of four or five arteries arising from the popliteal artery, with distribution to the muscles and integument of the calf, and with anastomoses to the posterior tibial, medial and lateral inferior genicular arteries.
