= Medial genicular artery =

Medial genicular artery may refer to:

- Inferior medial genicular artery
- Superior medial genicular artery
