= Lateral genicular artery =

Lateral genicular artery may refer to:

- Inferior lateral genicular artery
- Superior lateral genicular artery
