= Middle genicular artery =

Small branch of the popliteal artery that supplies parts of the knee joint

Details
- Supplies: Ligaments and synovial membrane in the interior of the knee-joint

Identifiers
- Latin: arteria media genus
- TA98: A12.2.16.036
- TA2: 4702
- FMA: 22536

The middle genicular artery (azygos articular artery) is a small branch of the popliteal artery. It supplies parts of the knee joint.

== Structure ==
The middle genicular artery (MGA) arises from the anterolateral surface of the popliteal artery. This point of origin is distal to the superior genicular arteries, and between, equidistantly, the medial condyle of femur and the lateral condyle of femur. As a normal variation, the MGA may emerge from the popliteal artery at a common point of origin shared with the superior lateral genicular artery, or both vessels may arise at separate, distinct points.

The angle at which the middle genicular artery leaves the popliteal artery varies with flexion and extension of the knee. It may form a near 90° angle when the knee is flexed, but an angle of only between 15° and 30° when the knee is extended.

The diameter of the MGA is between 2 and 4 millimetres, and its length between 3 and 5 centimetres. It has two venae comitantes along its length. It pierces the oblique popliteal ligament and the joint capsule of the knee.

== Function ==
The middle genicular artery supplies the anterior cruciate ligament and the posterior cruciate ligament. It also supplies the synovial membrane at the bottom of the knee.

== Clinical significance ==
The middle genicular artery may be damaged during knee arthroscopy, particularly using a posterior approach through the popliteal fossa. It may also be damaged in traumatic injuries to the knee, often caused by sports.
