= Saphenous branch =

Saphenous branch may refer to:

- Saphenous branch of descending genicular artery
- Saphenous nerve
