= Popliteal fossa =

Depression at back of knee joint

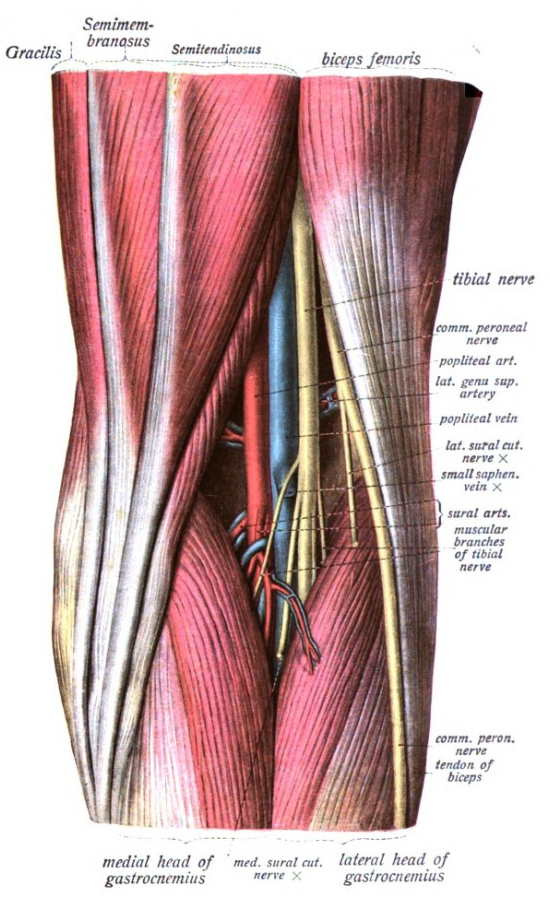
- Popliteal fossa of the right leg.

Details

Identifiers
- Latin: fossa poplitea
- TA98: A01.2.08.013
- TA2: 324
- FMA: 22525

The popliteal fossa (also referred to as hough or kneepit in analogy to the cubital fossa) is a shallow depression located at the back of the knee joint. The bones of the popliteal fossa are the femur and the tibia. Like other flexion surfaces of large joints (groin, armpit, cubital fossa and essentially the anterior part of the neck), it is an area where blood vessels and nerves pass relatively superficially, and with an increased number of lymph nodes.

== Structure ==
=== Boundaries ===
The boundaries of the fossa are:

	Medial	Lateral
Superior	the semimembranosus and semitendinosus muscles	the biceps femoris muscle
Inferior	the medial head of the gastrocnemius muscle	the lateral head of the gastrocnemius muscle and plantaris muscle

=== Roof ===
Moving from superficial to deep structures, the roof is formed by:

1. the skin.
2. the superficial fascia. This contains the small saphenous vein, the terminal branch of the posterior cutaneous nerve of the thigh, posterior division of the medial cutaneous nerve, lateral sural cutaneous nerve, and medial sural cutaneous nerve.
3. the popliteal fascia.

=== Floor ===
The floor is formed by:

1. the popliteal surface of the femur.
2. the capsule of the knee joint and the oblique popliteal ligament.
3. strong fascia covering the popliteus muscle.

=== Contents ===
Structures within the popliteal fossa include, (from superficial to deep):

- tibial nerve
- common fibular nerve (also known as the common peroneal nerve)
- popliteal vein
- popliteal artery, a continuation of the femoral artery
- small saphenous vein (termination)
- Popliteal lymph nodes and vessels

It is of note that the common fibular nerve also begins at the superior angle of the popliteal fossa.

== Additional images ==
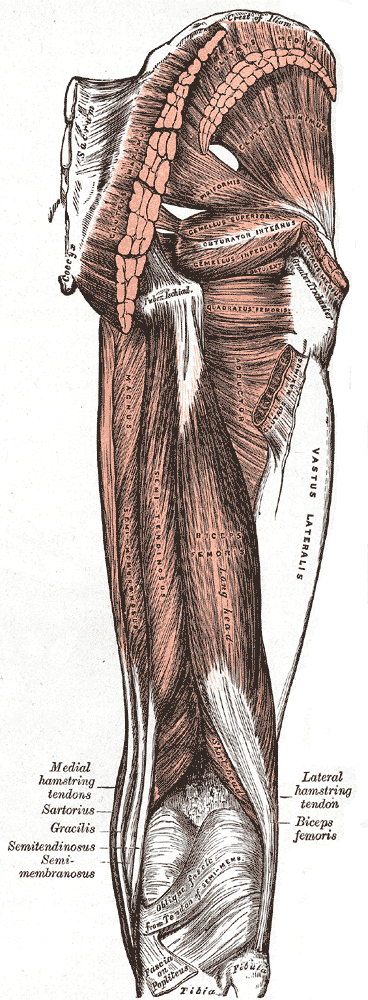
Muscles of the gluteal and posterior femoral regions.

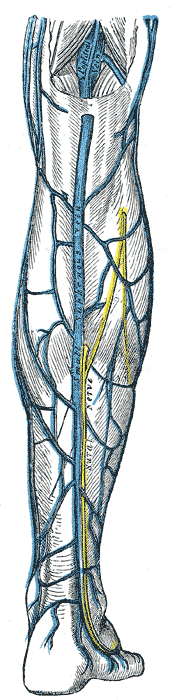
Small saphenous vein and its tributaries.

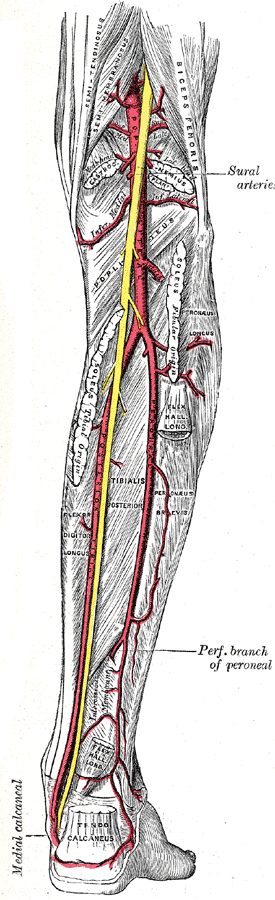
The popliteal, posterior tibial, and peroneal arteries.

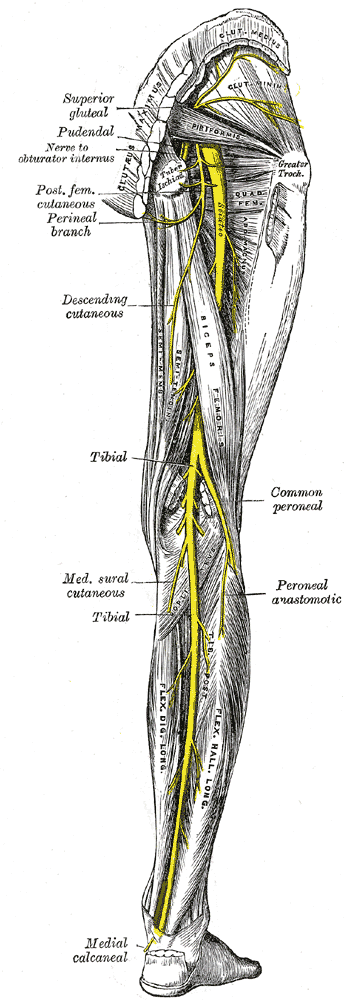
Nerves of the right lower extremity. Posterior view.

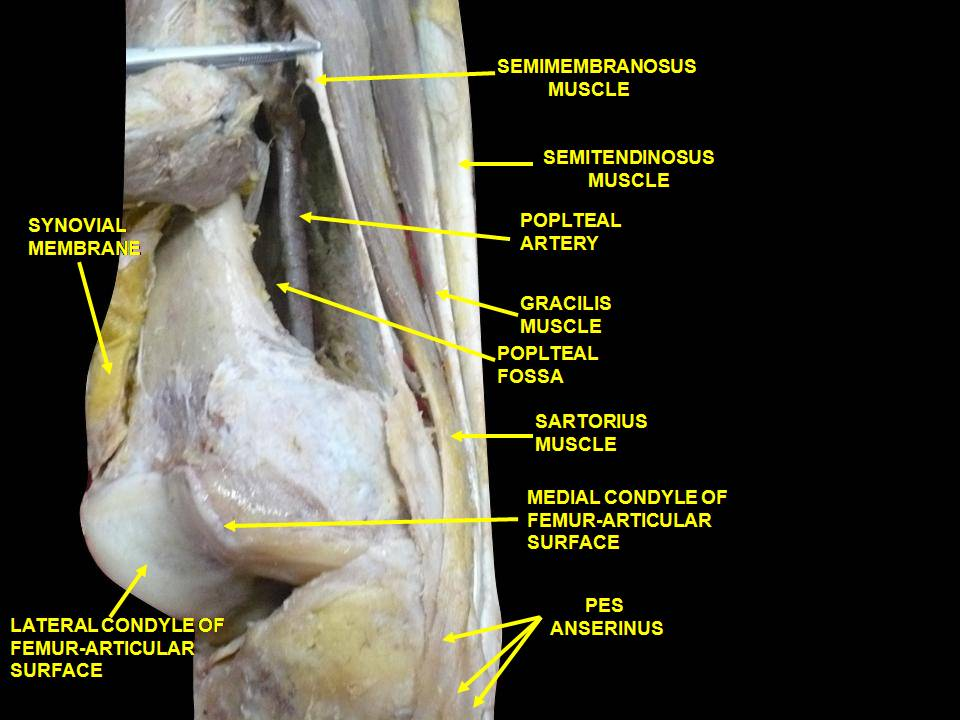
Muscles of thigh. Lateral view.

== See also ==
- Hamstring
