= Medial superior genicular artery =

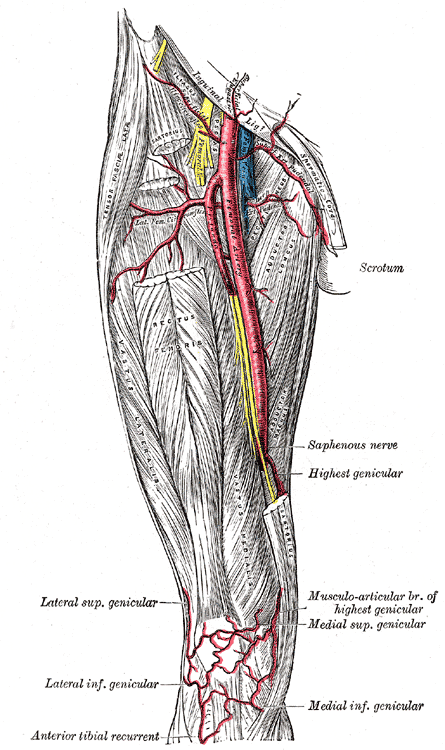
- The femoral artery. (Medial sup. genicular labeled at bottom right.)

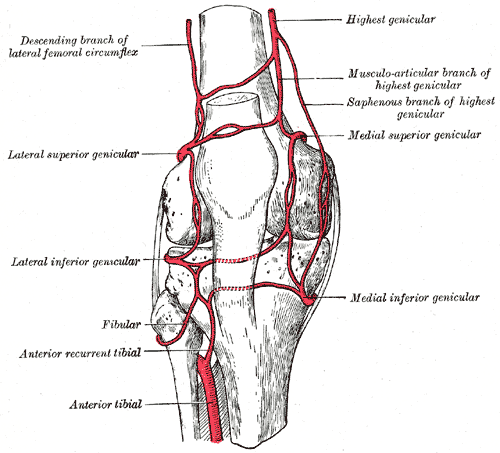
- Circumpatellar anastomosis. (Medial superior genicular labeled at upper right, fourth from top.)

Details
- Branches: Branch to vastus medialis, branch to surface of the femur and the knee-joint

Identifiers
- Latin: arteria superior medialis genus
- TA98: A12.2.16.035
- TA2: 4701
- FMA: 22584

The medial superior genicular artery is a branch of the popliteal artery. It runs deep to the semimembranosus, semitendinosus, and tendon of the adductor magnus, and superior to the medial head of the gastrocnemius.

It divides into two branches, one of which supplies the vastus medialis, anastomosing with the highest genicular and medial inferior genicular arteries; the other ramifies close to the surface of the femur, supplying it and the knee-joint, and anastomosing with the lateral superior genicular artery.

The medial superior genicular artery is frequently of small size, a condition which is associated with an increase in the size of the highest genicular.

== See also ==
- Patellar anastomosis
