= Deep transverse fascia =

Anatomy term

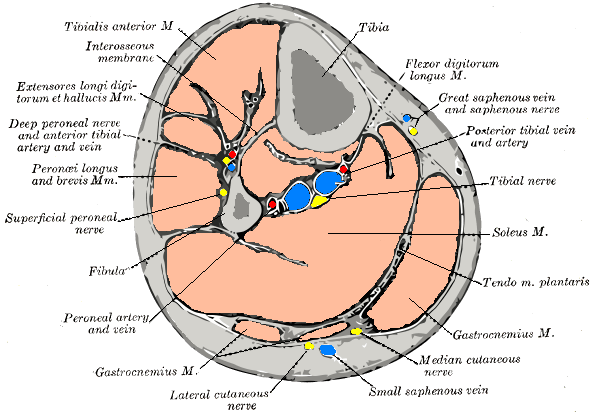
- Cross-section through middle of leg.
- TA2: 2711

The deep transverse fascia or transverse intermuscular septum of leg is a transversely placed, intermuscular septum, from the deep fascia, between the superficial and deep muscles of the back of the leg.

At the sides it is connected to the margins of the tibia and fibula.

Above, where it covers the popliteus, it is thick and dense, and receives an expansion from the tendon of the semimembranosus. It is thinner in the middle of the leg; but below, where it covers the tendons passing behind the malleoli, it is thickened and continuous with the laciniate ligament.
