= Soleus muscle =

Muscle in the back part of the lower leg

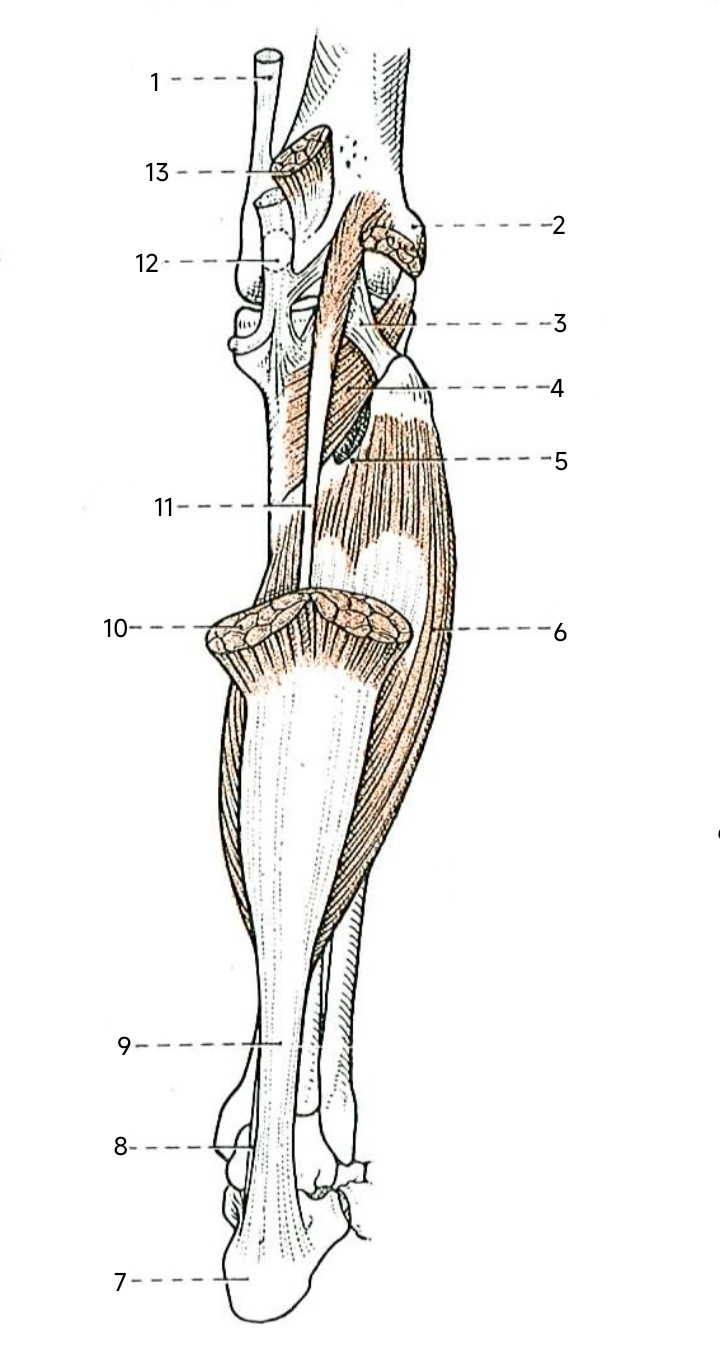
- Illustration depicting the soleus and surrounding anatomy. 1: Adductor magnus, 2: Lateral head of gastrocnemius, 3: Arcuate popliteal ligament, 4: Popliteus, 5: Tendinous arch of the soleus, 6: Soleus, 7: Calcaneus, 8: Plantaris, 9: Achilles tendon, 10: Medial head of gastrocnemius, 11: Plantaris, 12: Semimembranus plus bursa, 13: Medial head of gastrocnemius. (After Charpy.)

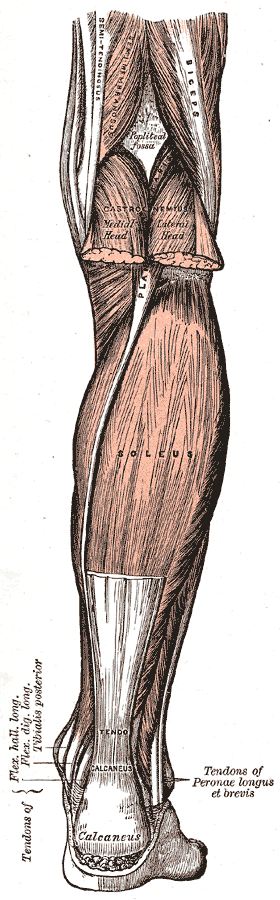
- The soleus muscle and surrounding structures, from Gray's Anatomy. This is a view of the back of the right leg; most of the gastrocnemius muscle has been removed.

Details
- Origin: Fibula, medial border of tibia (soleal line)
- Insertion: Tendo calcaneus
- Artery: Popliteal artery, posterior tibial artery, peroneal artery
- Nerve: Tibial nerve, specifically, nerve roots L_{5}–S_{2}
- Actions: Plantar flexion
- Antagonist: Tibialis anterior

Identifiers
- Latin: musculus soleus
- TA98: A04.7.02.047
- TA2: 2660
- FMA: 22542

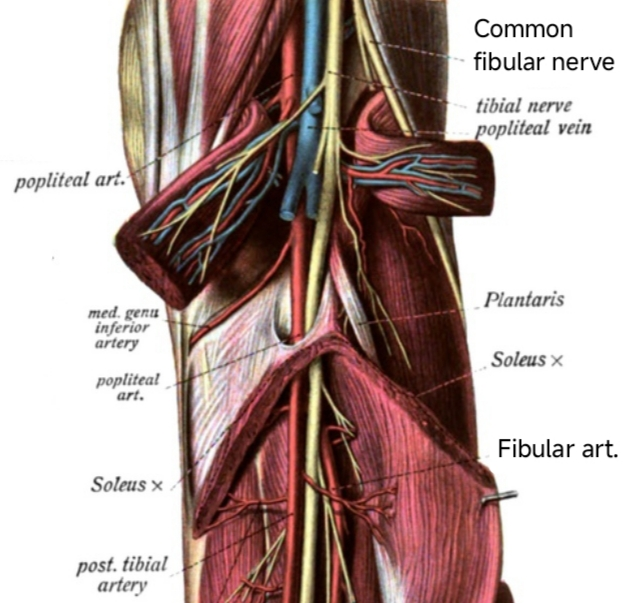
Tendinous arch of the soleus (at center, not labeled); right lower limb, posterior view. (From Sobotta's Atlas of Human Anatomy.)

In humans and some other mammals, the soleus is a powerful muscle in the back part of the lower leg (the calf). It runs from just below the knee to the heel and is involved in standing and walking. It is closely connected to the gastrocnemius muscle, and some anatomists consider this combination to be a single muscle, the triceps surae. Its name is derived from the Latin word "solea", meaning "sandal".

== Structure ==
The soleus is located superficially in the posterior compartment of the leg.

The soleus exhibits significant morphological differences across species. It is unipennate in many species. In some animals, such as the rabbit, it is fused for much of its length with the gastrocnemius muscle.

The soleus is a complex, multi-pennate muscle in humans, normally having a separate (posterior) aponeurosis from the gastrocnemius muscle. Most soleus muscle fibers originate from each side of the anterior aponeurosis, attached to the tibia and fibula. Other fibers originate from the posterior (back) surfaces of the head of the fibula and its upper quarter, as well as the middle third of the medial border of the tibia.

The fibers originating from the anterior surface of the anterior aponeurosis insert onto the median septum, and the fibers originating from the posterior surface of the anterior aponeurosis insert onto the posterior aponeurosis. The posterior aponeurosis and median septum join in the lower quarter of the muscle and then join with the anterior aponeuroses of the gastrocnemius muscles to form the calcaneal tendon, or Achilles tendon, and inserts onto the posterior surface of the calcaneus, or heel bone.

In contrast to some animals, the human soleus and gastrocnemius muscles are relatively separate, so shear can be detected between the soleus and gastrocnemius aponeuroses.

The soleus is vestigial in the horse.

=== Relations ===
The gastrocnemius muscle is superficial to (closer to the skin than) the soleus, which lies below the gastrocnemius.

The plantaris muscle and a portion of its tendon run between the two muscles. Deep to it (further from the skin) is the transverse intermuscular septum, which separates the superficial posterior compartment of the leg from the deep posterior compartment.

On the other side of the fascia are the tibialis posterior muscle, the flexor digitorum longus muscle, and the flexor hallucis longus muscle, along with the posterior tibial artery and posterior tibial vein and the tibial nerve.

Since the anterior compartment of the leg is lateral to the tibia, the bulge of muscle medial to the tibia on the anterior side is the posterior compartment. The soleus is superficial middle of the tibia.

== Function ==
The action of the calf muscles, including the soleus, is plantar flexion of the foot (that is, they increase the angle between the foot and the leg). They are powerful muscles vital in walking, running, and keeping balance. The soleus plays an important role in maintaining standing posture; if not for its constant pull, the body would fall forward.

Also, in upright posture, the soleus is responsible for pumping venous blood back into the heart from the periphery each time it contracts and is hence often called the skeletal muscle pump, peripheral heart or the sural (tricipital) pump.

Soleus muscles have more slow muscle fibers than many other muscles. In some animals, such as the guinea pig and cat, soleus consists of 100% slow muscle fibers. Human soleus fiber composition is variable, containing between 60% and 100% slow fibers.

The soleus is the most effective muscle for plantar flexion in a bent knee position. The gastrocnemius originates on the femur, so bending the leg limits its effective tension. During regular movement (i.e., walking) the soleus is the primary muscle utilized for plantar flexion due to the slow-twitch fibers resisting fatigue.

== Innervation ==
The soleus is innervated by the tibial nerve (L4, L5, S1, S2)

== Clinical significance ==
=== Disease ===
Due to the thick fascia covering the leg muscles, they are prone to compartment syndrome. This pathology relates to tissue inflammation affecting blood flow and compressing nerves. If left untreated, compartment syndrome can lead to atrophy of muscles, blood clots, and neuropathy.

== Additional images ==
Animation.

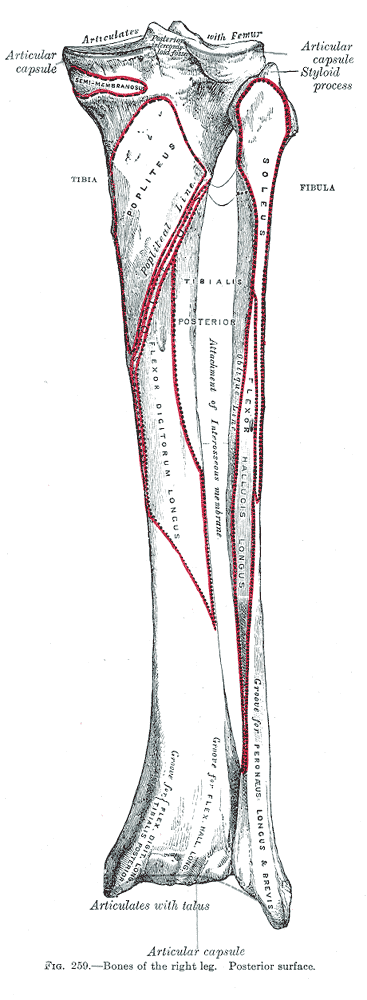
Bones of the right leg. Posterior surface.

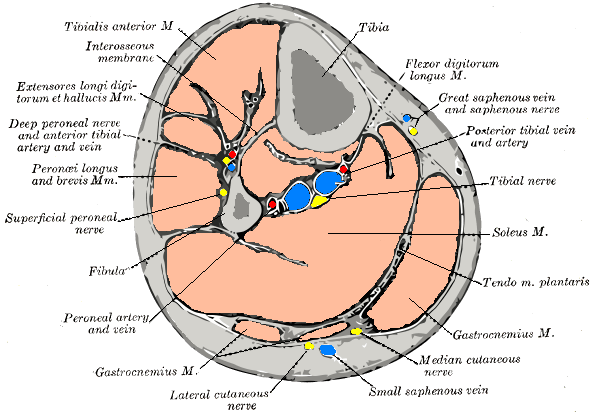
Cross-section through middle of leg.

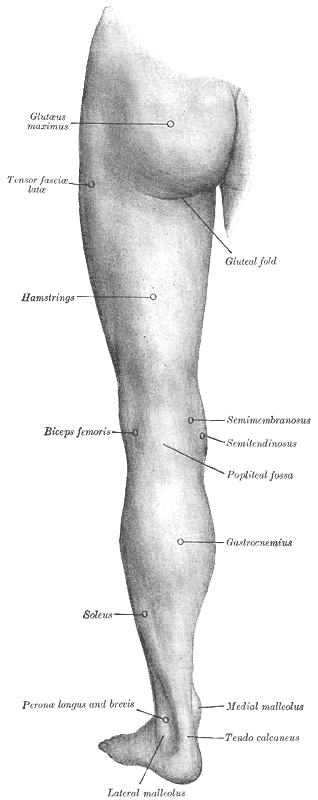
Back of left lower extremity.

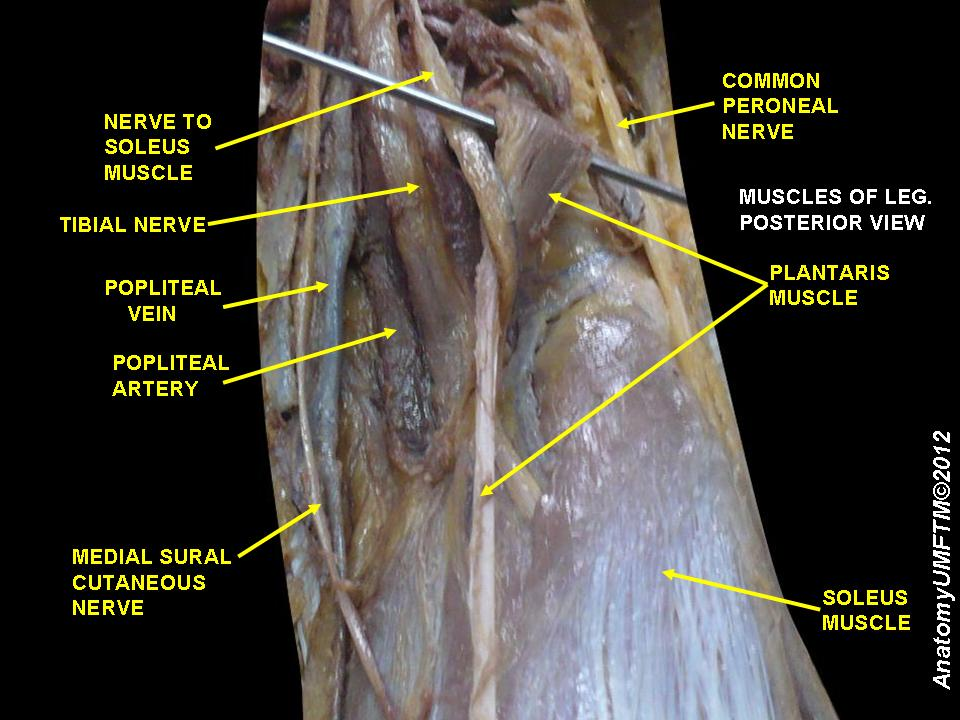
Posterior view.
