= Superior genicular arteries =

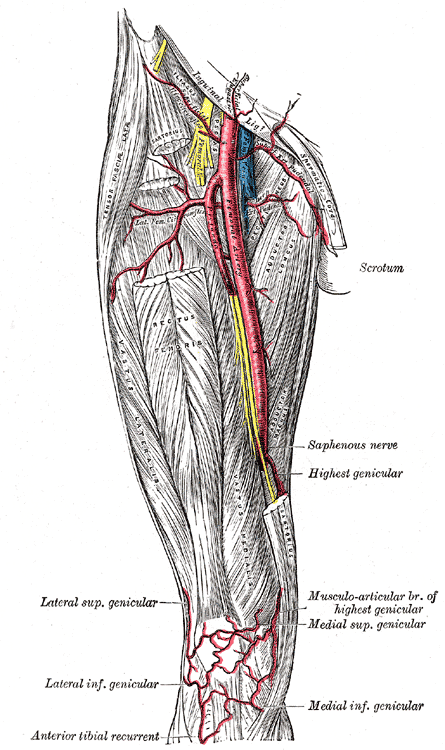
- The femoral artery.

Details

Identifiers
- Latin: arteriae genus superiores
- FMA: 22535

The superior genicular arteries (superior articular arteries), two in number, arise one on either side of the popliteal artery, and wind around the femur immediately above its condyles to the front of the knee-joint. The medial superior genicular artery is on the inside of the knee and the lateral superior genicular artery is on the outside.

== See also ==
- Patellar anastomosis
