= Patellar network =

Network of blood vessels around the knee

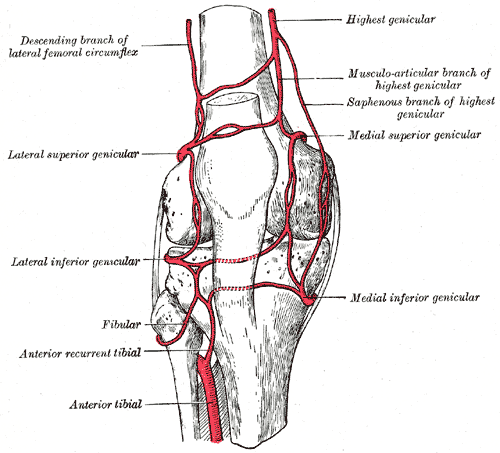
- Circumpatellar anastomosis.

Details

Identifiers
- Latin: rete patellare, anastomosis patellaris, rete articulare genus
- TA98: A12.2.16.041
- TA2: 4707
- FMA: 44677

The patellar network (circulatory anastomosis around the knee-joint, patellar anastomosis, genicular anastomosis, articular vascular network of knee or rete articulare genus) is an intricate network of blood vessels around and above the patella, and on the contiguous ends of the femur and tibia, forming a superficial and a deep plexus.

- The superficial plexus is situated between the fascia and skin around about the patella, and forms three well-defined arches: one, above the upper border of the patella, in the loose connective tissue over the quadriceps femoris; the other two, below the level of the patella, are situated in the fat behind the patellar ligament.
- The deep plexus, which forms a close net-work of vessels, lies on the lower end of the femur and upper end of the tibia around their articular surfaces, and sends numerous offsets into the interior of the joint.

The genicular arteries which form this plexus are the medial inferior and medial superior genicular arteries, the lateral inferior and lateral superior genicular arteries, the descending genicular artery, the descending branch of lateral femoral circumflex artery, and the anterior tibial recurrent artery.

== Clinical relevance ==
The genicular anastomosis provides collateral circulation to supply the leg when the knee is fully flexed.

When the knee suffers a popliteal aneurysm, if the femoral artery has to be ligated surgically, blood can still reach the popliteal artery distal to the ligation via the genicular anastomosis. However, if flow in the femoral artery of a normal leg is suddenly disrupted, blood flow distally is rarely sufficient. The reason for this is the fact that the genicular anastomosis is only present in a minority of individuals and is always undeveloped when disease in the femoral artery is absent.

Illustrations of the genicular anastomosis in textbooks all appear to have been derived from the idealized image, shown in the sidebox, produced first by Gray's Anatomy in 1910. Neither the 1910 illustration, nor any subsequent version, was made of an anatomical dissection but rather from the writings of John Hunter (surgeon) and Astley Cooper which described the genicular anastomosis many years after ligation of the femoral artery for popliteal aneurysm. The genicular anastomosis has not been demonstrated even with modern imaging techniques such as X-ray computed tomography or angiography.
