= Oblique popliteal ligament =

Ligament on the back of the knee

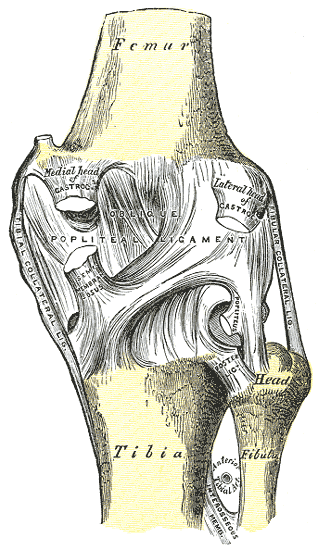
- Right knee-joint. Posterior view. (Oblique popliteal ligament visible at center.)

Details
- From: Lateral epicondyle of the femur, lateral condyle of femur
- To: Medial condyle of tibia

Identifiers
- Latin: ligamentum popliteum obliquum
- TA98: A03.6.08.013
- TA2: 1899
- FMA: 44582

The oblique popliteal ligament (posterior ligament) is a broad, flat, fibrous ligament on the posterior knee. It is an extension of the tendon of the semimembranosus muscle. It attaches onto the intercondylar fossa and lateral condyle of the femur. It reinforces the posterior central portion of the knee joint capsule.

== Anatomy ==
The oblique popliteal ligament is formed as a lateral expansion of the tendon of the semimembranosus muscle and represents one of the muscle's five insertions. The ligament blends with the posterior portion of the knee joint capsule. It exhibits a large opening through which nerves and vessels pass.

=== Attachments ===
The ligament extends superolaterally from the semimembranosus tendon to attach onto the intercondylar fossa and lateral condyle of the femur.

=== Relations ===
The oblique popliteal ligament forms part of the floor of the popliteal fossa; the popliteal artery lies upon the ligament. The ligament is pierced by posterior division of the obturator nerve, as well as the middle genicular nerve, the middle genicular artery, and the middle genicular vein.

== Clinical significance ==
The oblique popliteal ligament may be damaged, causing a valgus deformity. Surgical repair of the ligament often leads to better outcomes than conservative management.

The oblique popliteal ligament may be cut during arthroscopic meniscus repair surgery.

== Additional images ==
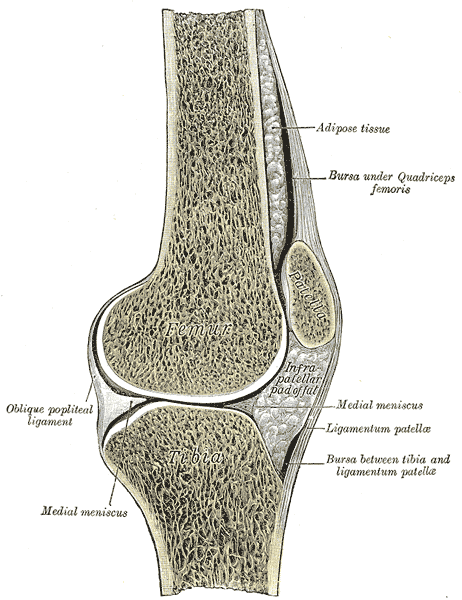
Sagittal section of right knee-joint.
