= Anterior tibial recurrent artery =

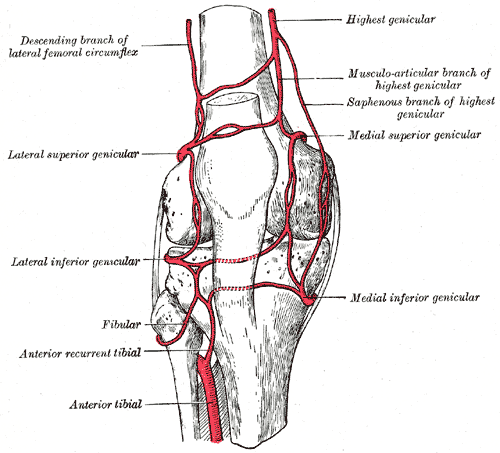
- Patellar network (anterior recurrent tibial visible at bottom left)

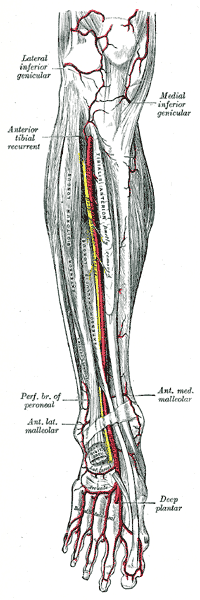
- Anterior tibial and dorsalis pedis arteries (anterior tibial recurrent visible at center left)

Details
- Source: Anterior tibial artery

Identifiers
- Latin: arteria recurrens tibialis anterior
- TA98: A12.2.16.043
- TA2: 4709
- FMA: 43902

The anterior tibial recurrent artery is a small artery in the leg. It arises from the anterior tibial artery, as soon as that vessel has passed through the interosseous space. It ascends in the tibialis anterior muscle, ramifies on the front and sides of the knee-joint, and assists in the formation of the patellar plexus by anastomosing with the genicular branches of the popliteal, and with the highest genicular artery.
