= Inferior genicular arteries =

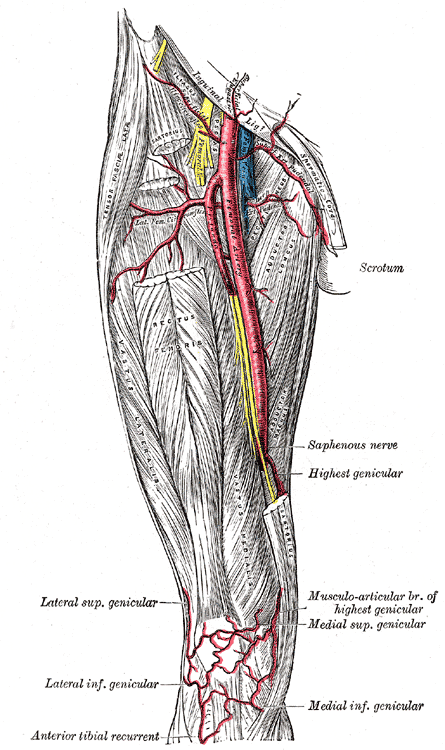
- The femoral artery.

Details

Identifiers
- Latin: arteriae genus inferiores
- FMA: 22537

The inferior genicular arteries (inferior articular arteries), two in number, arise from the popliteal beneath the gastrocnemius. On the inside of the knee, is the medial inferior genicular artery, and on the outer side is the lateral inferior genicular artery.

== See also ==
- Patellar anastomosis
