= Descending genicular artery =

- Arteries of the thigh. The descending genicular artery and its branches visible at the bottom right

Details
- Source: femoral artery
- Branches: saphenous and muscular and articular branches

Identifiers
- Latin: arteria descendens genus
- TA98: A12.2.16.017
- TA2: 4682
- FMA: 22506

The descending genicular artery (also known as the highest genicular artery) arises from the femoral artery just before its passage through the adductor hiatus.

The descending geniculate artery immediately divides into two branches: a saphenous branch (which classically joins with the medial inferior genicular artery), and muscular and articular branches.

== Structure ==
=== Branches ===
==== Saphenous branch ====
The saphenous branch pierces the aponeurotic covering of the adductor canal, and accompanies the saphenous nerve to the medial side of the knee. It passes between the sartorius muscle and the gracilis muscle, and, piercing the fascia lata, is distributed to the integument of the upper and medial part of the leg, anastomosing with the medial inferior genicular artery.

==== Articular branches ====
The articular branches descend within the vastus medialis muscle, and in front of the tendon of the adductor magnus muscle, to the medial side of the knee, where they join with the medial superior genicular and anterior recurrent tibial artery.

A branch from this vessel crosses above the patellar surface of the femur, forming an anastomotic arch with the lateral superior genicular artery, and supplying branches to the knee-joint.
