= Plantaris muscle =

One of the superficial muscles of the superficial posterior compartment of the leg

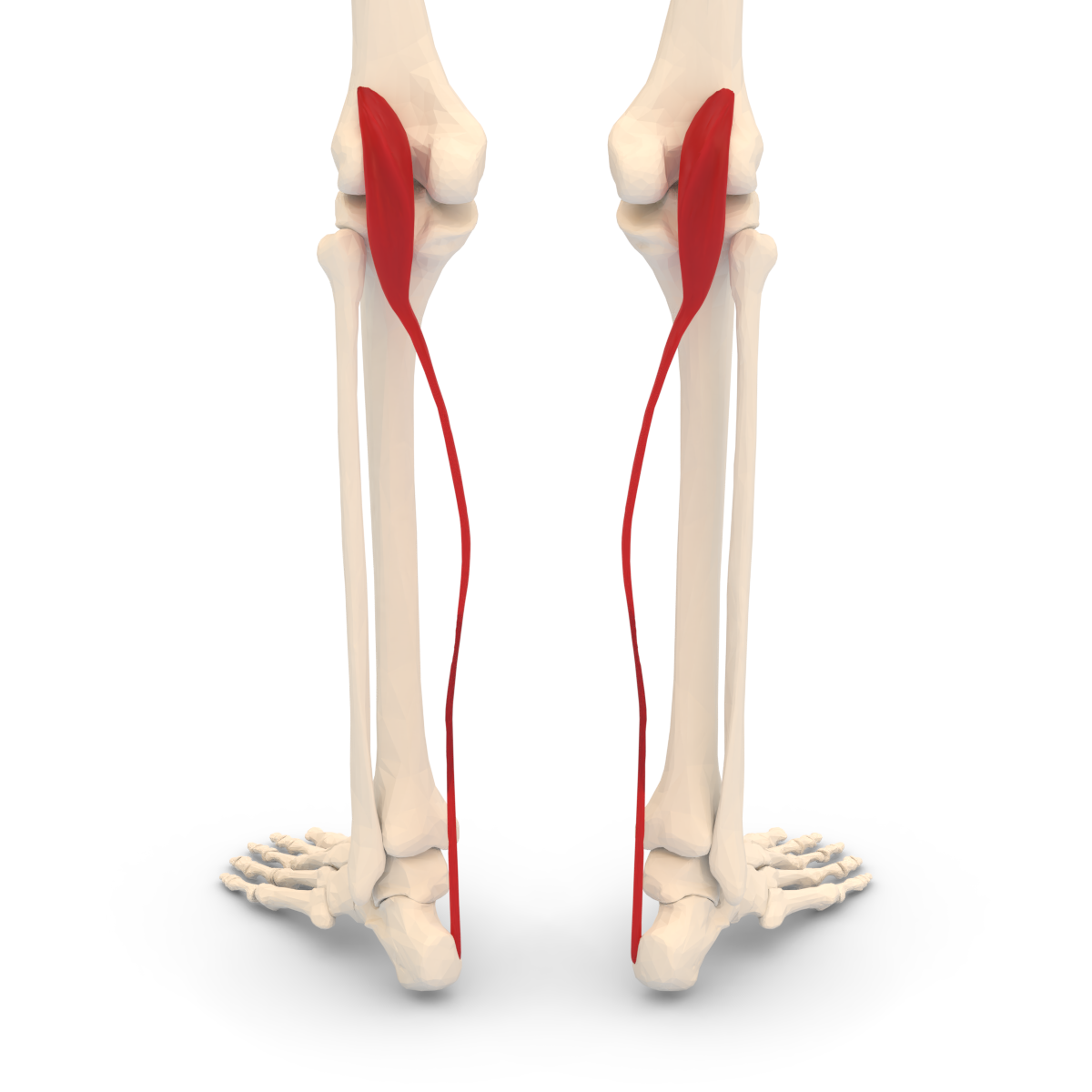
- Plantaris muscle seen from behind
- Dissection video (1 min 23 s)

Details
- Origin: Lateral supracondylar ridge of femur above lateral head of gastrocnemius
- Insertion: Tendo calcaneus (medial side, deep to gastrocnemius tendon)
- Artery: Sural arteries
- Nerve: Tibial nerve from anterior rami of S1-S2
- Actions: Plantar flexes foot and flexes knee
- Antagonist: Tibialis anterior muscle

Identifiers
- Latin: musculus plantaris
- TA98: A04.7.02.049
- TA2: 2663
- FMA: 22543

The plantaris is one of the superficial muscles of the superficial posterior compartment of the leg, one of the fascial compartments of the leg.

It is composed of a thin muscle belly and a long thin tendon. While not as thick as the achilles tendon, the plantaris tendon (which tends to be between 30–45 centimetres (12–18 in) in length) is the longest tendon in the human body. Not including the tendon, the plantaris muscle is approximately 5–10 centimetres (2.0–3.9 in) long and is absent in 8-12% of the population. It is one of the plantar flexors in the posterior compartment of the leg, along with the gastrocnemius and soleus muscles. The plantaris is considered to have become an unimportant muscle when human ancestors switched from climbing trees to bipedalism and in anatomically modern humans it mainly acts with the gastrocnemius. It is a small muscle forming one of the inferior and lateral boundary of the popliteal fossa.

== Structure ==
The plantaris muscle arises from the inferior part of the lateral supracondylar ridge of the femur at a position slightly superior to the origin of the lateral head of gastrocnemius. It passes posterior to the knee joint in an inferomedial direction and becomes tendinous distally to insert into the Achilles tendon. It occasionally separately inserts into the medial side of the calcaneus.

=== Innervation ===
The plantaris muscle is innervated by the tibial nerve, a branch of the sciatic nerve in the sacral plexus. Signaling for contraction begins in the frontal lobe of the brain with the pre-central gyrus (primary motor cortex). Upper motor neurons are stimulated and send a signal through the internal capsule and down the corticospinal tract. Decussation of the lateral corticospinal tract occurs in the medullary pyramids, then the fibers continue down the contralateral side of the spinal cord. Upper motor neurons synapse with lower motor neurons at the anterior horn of the spinal cord in the sacral plexus (formed from the anterior rami of spinal nerves L4, L5, S1–4). The lower motor neuron fibers continue down the sciatic nerve and then diverge into the tibial and common fibular nerves. The tibial nerve runs medially at the knee joint. When the tibial nerve receives an action potential, the plantaris muscle contracts, providing weak plantar flexion of the foot and weak flexion of the knee.

=== Variation ===
The muscle may arise from the oblique popliteal ligament. Interdigitations with the lateral head of the gastrocnemius and a fibrous extension of the muscle to the patella are not unusual.

== Function ==
The plantaris acts to weakly plantar flex the ankle joint and flex the knee joint.

The plantaris muscle may also provide proprioceptive feedback information to the central nervous system regarding the position of the foot. The unusually high density of proprioceptive receptor end organs supports this notion.

Its motor function is so minimal that its long tendon can readily be harvested for reconstruction elsewhere with little functional deficit. Often mistaken for a nerve by new medical students (and thus called the "freshman's nerve"), the muscle was useful to other primates for grasping with their feet.

== Clinical significance ==
A common injury that is normally attributed to the plantaris muscle is a condition called tennis leg. Although pain in the calf can be attributed to a rupture of the plantaris muscle, recent ultrasound research has shown that tennis leg more commonly arises from tears in the musculotendinous junction of the medial gastrocnemius. In one clinical study, 94 out of 141 patients (66.7%) diagnosed with tennis leg were found with a partial rupture of the gastrocnemius muscle, while rupture of the plantaris tendon was only seen in 2 patients (1.4%).

Injury may occur from running, jumping, or pushing off one leg in sports such as tennis, basketball and soccer, which require quick foot movement in a certain direction. Isolated plantaris muscle strains are rare, and ruptures normally occur in conjunction with injury to other muscles in the posterior compartment of the lower leg. Symptoms of a plantaris muscle rupture may include an audible popping sound in the area during physical activity, swelling, pain in the back of the lower leg, and persistent soreness. Ankle flexion may also be painful.

== See also ==
- Compartmental syndrome

== Additional images ==
Animation

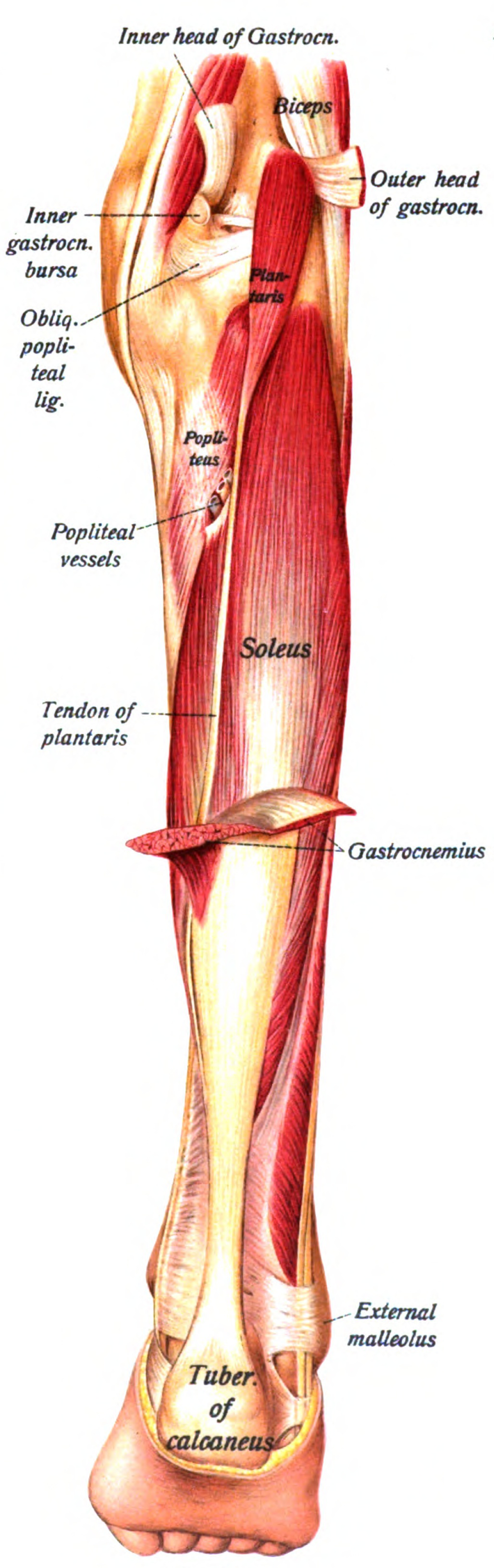
The plantaris is visible under the gastrocnemius.

Dissection video (59 s)

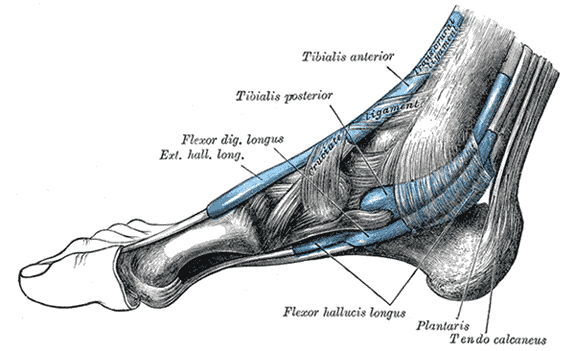
The synovial sheaths of the tendons around the ankle. Medial aspect. (Tendon of Plantaris labeled at bottom right.)

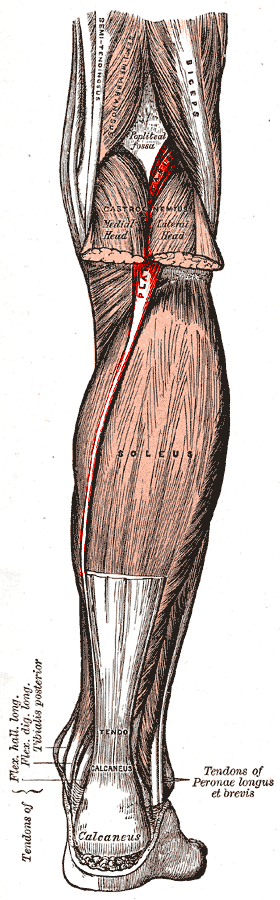
Muscles of the back of the leg. Superficial layer. Right lower limb.

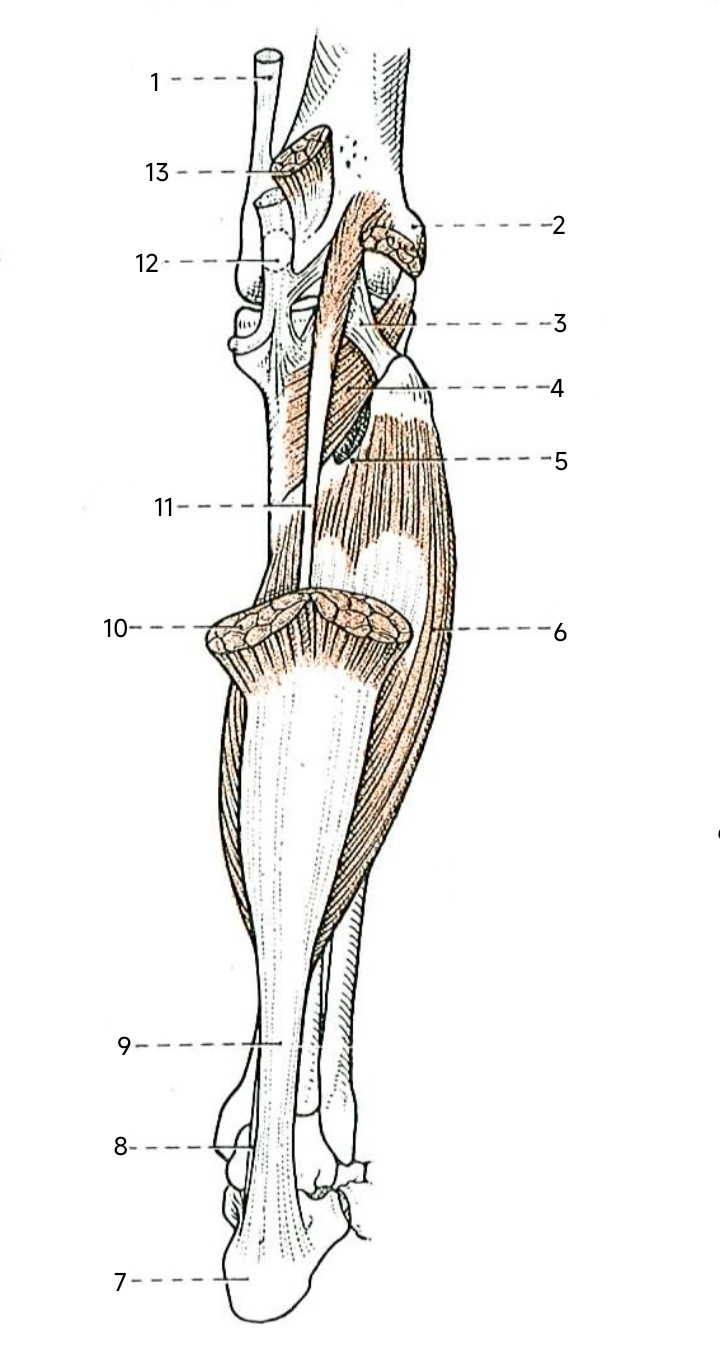
Plantaris (labeled 8 and 11) and surrounding anatomy. Right lower limb. (After Charpy.)

Cross-section through middle of leg. Tendon of plantaris is located between soleus and gastrocnemius.

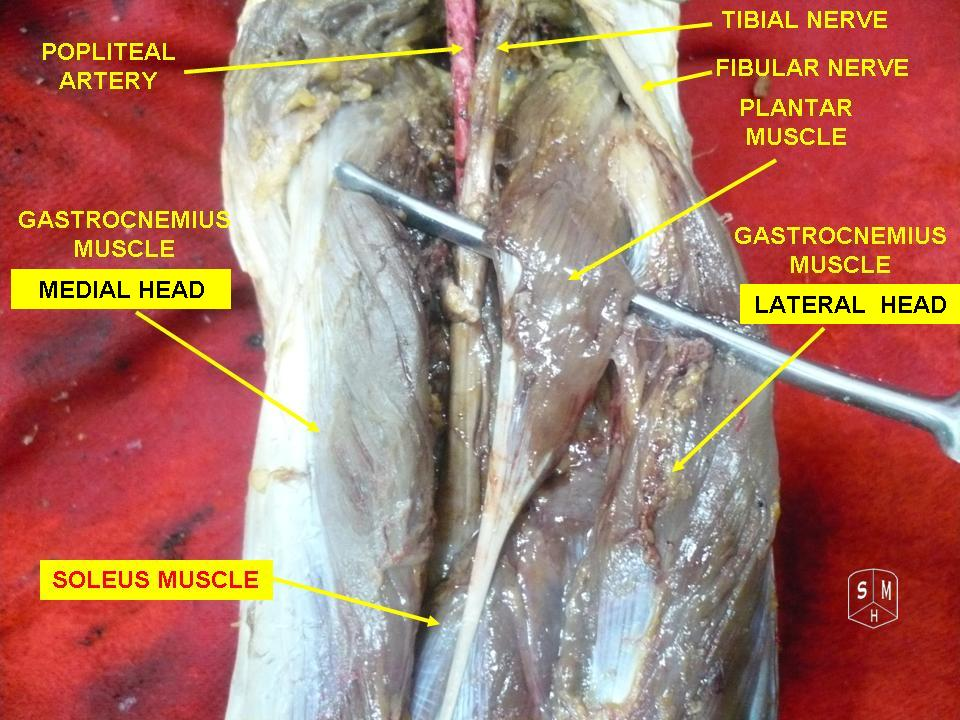
Plantaris muscle

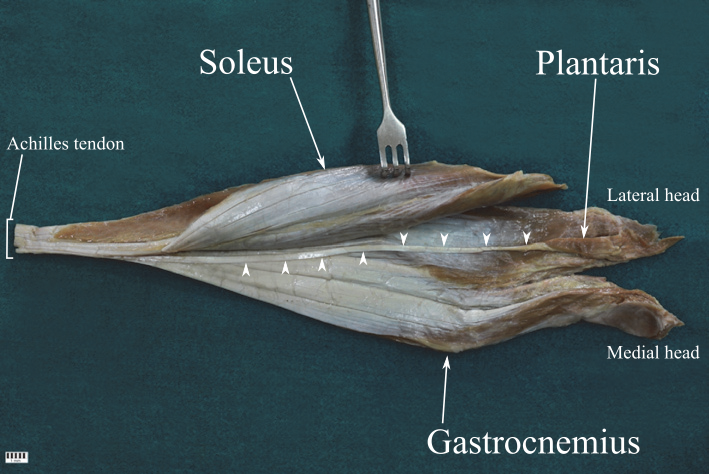
Plantaris tendon runs between soleus and gastrocnemius. Plantaris tendon is indicated by white arrow-heads.
