= Arcuate popliteal ligament =

Ligament of the knee

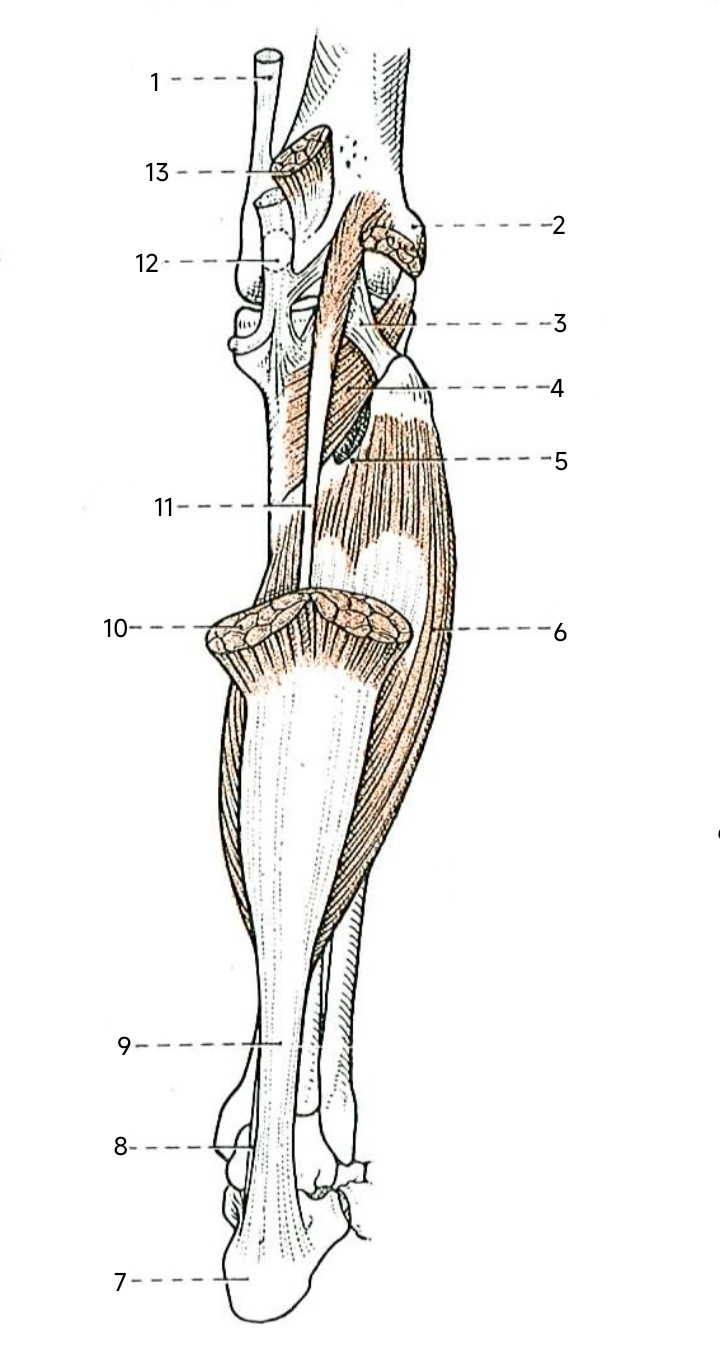
- Arcuate popliteal ligament (labeled 3) and surrounding anatomy; right lower limb, posterior view. (After Charpy.)

Details
- From: Head of the fibula

Identifiers
- Latin: ligamentum popliteum arcuatum
- TA98: A03.6.08.014
- TA2: 1900
- FMA: 44596

The arcuate popliteal ligament is an Y-shaped extracapsular ligament of the knee. It is formed as a thickening of the posterior fibres of the joint capsule of the knee. It reinforces the knee joint capsule inferolaterally.

== Anatomy ==
From its fibular attachment, the ligament extends superomedially over the tendon of the popliteus muscle, spreading out superficial to the posterior aspect of the tendon.

=== Attachments ===
Its inferior attachment is at the posterior aspect of the head of the fibula.

It has two superior attachments:

- The medial part of the ligament extends superficial to the tendon of popliteus muscle to attach at the posterior part of the intercondylar area of tibia.
- The lateral part forms a separate band that extends to the posterior part of the lateral condyle of femur alongside the tendon of popliteus muscle.
