= Gluteal artery =

Gluteal artery (arteria glutea) may refer to:

- Superior gluteal artery
- Inferior gluteal artery
