= Lateral inferior genicular artery =

Artery in the leg

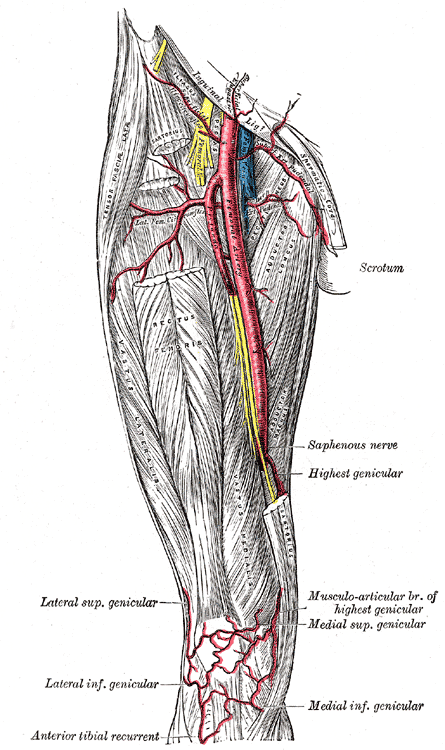
- The femoral artery. (Lateral inf. genicular labeled at lower left.)

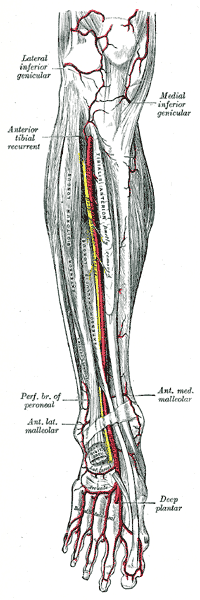
- Anterior tibial and dorsalis pedis arteries. (Lateral inferior genicular labeled at upper left.)

Details

Identifiers
- Latin: arteria inferior lateralis genus
- TA98: A12.2.16.038
- TA2: 4704
- FMA: 43888

The lateral inferior genicular is an artery of the leg.

== Course ==
It runs lateralward above the head of the fibula to the front of the knee-joint, passing in its course beneath the lateral head of the gastrocnemius, the fibular collateral ligament, and the tendon of the biceps femoris.

== Branching ==
It ends by dividing into branches, which anastomose with the Inferior medial genicular and superior lateral genicular arteries, and with the anterior recurrent tibial artery.

== See also ==
- Patellar anastomosis
