= Semimembranosus muscle =

One of the three hamstring muscles

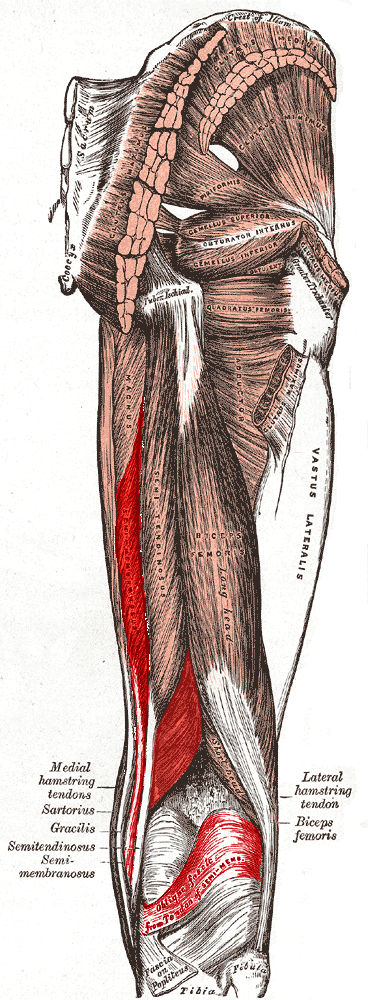
- Muscles of the gluteal and posterior femoral regions (semimembranosus labeled at bottom left)

Details
- Origin: Ischial tuberosity
- Insertion: Medial condyle of tibia
- Artery: Profunda femoris and gluteal arteries
- Nerve: Tibial part of sciatic nerve (L5, S1 and S2)
- Actions: Extension of hip and flexion of knee
- Antagonist: Quadriceps muscle and tensor fasciae latae

Identifiers
- Latin: musculus semimembranosus
- TA98: A04.7.02.036
- TA2: 2642
- FMA: 22438

The semimembranosus muscle (/ˌsɛmiˌmɛmbrəˈnoʊsəs/) is the most medial of the three hamstring muscles in the thigh. It is so named because it has a flat tendon of origin. It lies posteromedially in the thigh, deep to the semitendinosus muscle. It extends the hip joint and flexes the knee joint.

== Structure ==
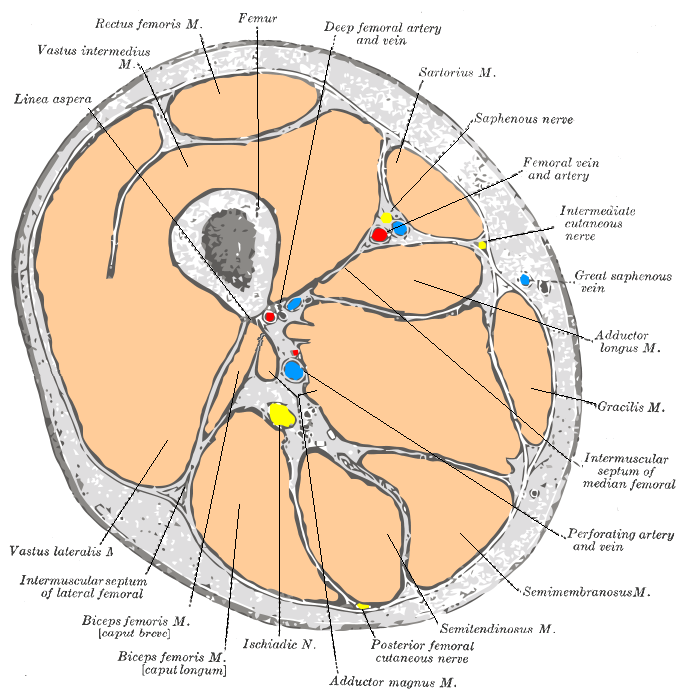
Cross-section of thigh semimembranosus labelled bottom right

The semimembranosus muscle, so called from its membranous tendon of origin, is situated at the back and medial side of the thigh. It is wider, flatter, and deeper than the semitendinosus (with which it shares very close insertion and attachment points). The muscle overlaps the upper part of the popliteal vessels.

=== Origin ===
The semimembranosus muscle originates by a thick tendon from the superolateral aspect of the ischial tuberosity. It arises above and medial to the biceps femoris muscle and semitendinosus muscle. The tendon of origin expands into an aponeurosis, which covers the upper part of the anterior surface of the muscle; from this aponeurosis, muscular fibers arise, and converge to another aponeurosis which covers the lower part of the posterior surface of the muscle and contracts into the tendon of insertion.

=== Insertion ===
The semimembranosus muscle inserts on the:

- medial condyle of the tibia.
- medial margin of the tibia.
- lateral condyle of femur.
- fascia of the popliteus muscle.

The tendon of insertion gives off certain fibrous expansions: one, of considerable size, passes upward and laterally to be inserted into the posterior lateral condyle of the femur, forming part of the oblique popliteal ligament of the knee-joint; a second is continued downward to the fascia which covers the popliteus muscle; while a few fibers join the medial collateral ligament of the joint and the fascia of the leg.

=== Nerve supply ===
The semimembranosus is innervated by the tibial part of the sciatic nerve. The sciatic nerve consists of the anterior divisions of ventral nerve roots from L4 through S3. These nerve roots are part of the larger nerve network–the sacral plexus. The tibial part of the sciatic nerve is also responsible for innervation of semitendinosus and the long head of biceps femoris.

=== Variation ===
The semimembranosus muscle may be reduced or absent, or double, arising mainly from the sacrotuberous ligament and giving a slip to the femur or adductor magnus.

== Function ==
The semimembranosus muscle extends (straightens) the hip joint. It also flexes (bends) the knee joint.

It also helps to medially rotate the knee: the tibia medially rotates on the femur when the knee is flexed. It medially rotates the femur when the hip is extended. The muscle can also aid in counteracting the forward bending at the hip joint.

== Clinical significance ==
The semitendinosus muscle may be dry needled.

== Additional images ==
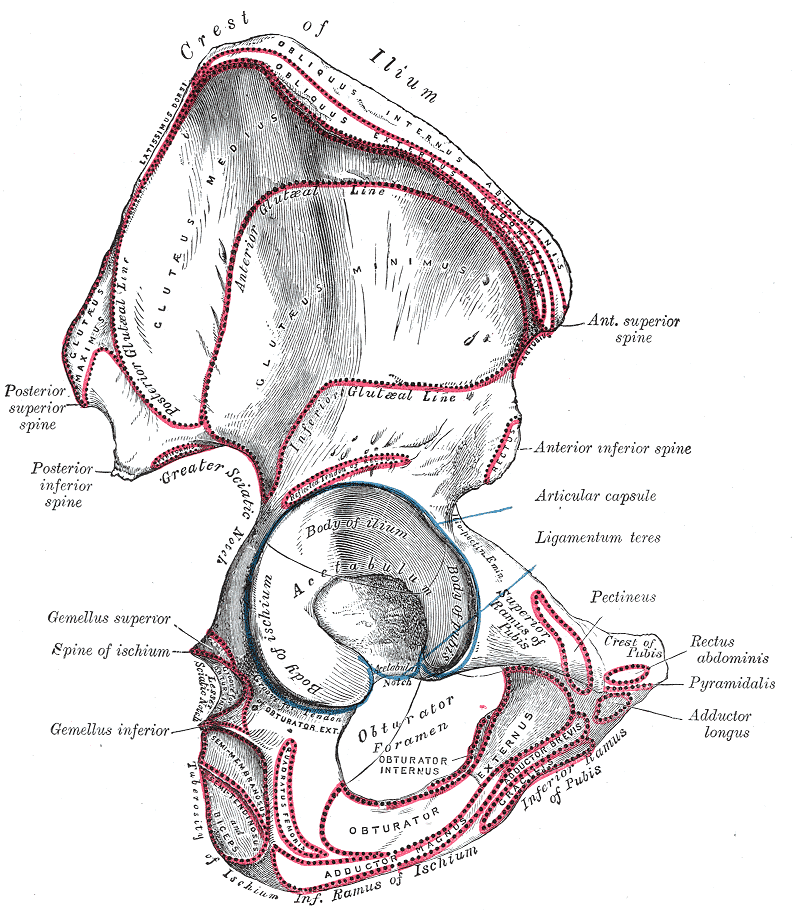
Right hip bone. External surface.

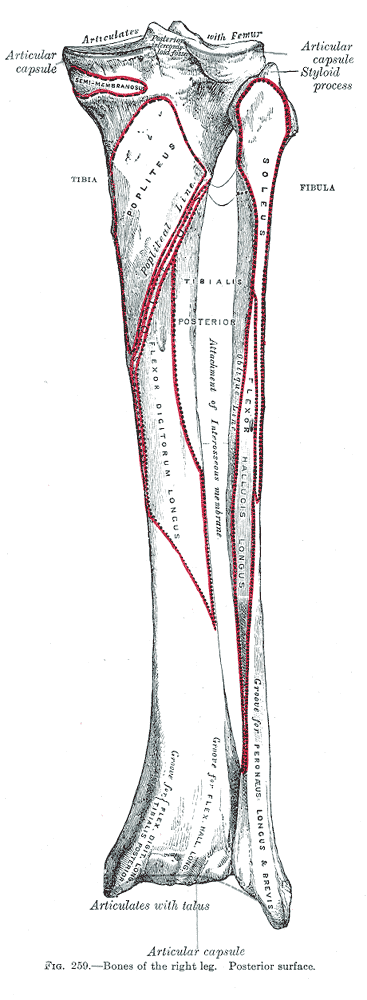
Bones of the right leg. Posterior surface.

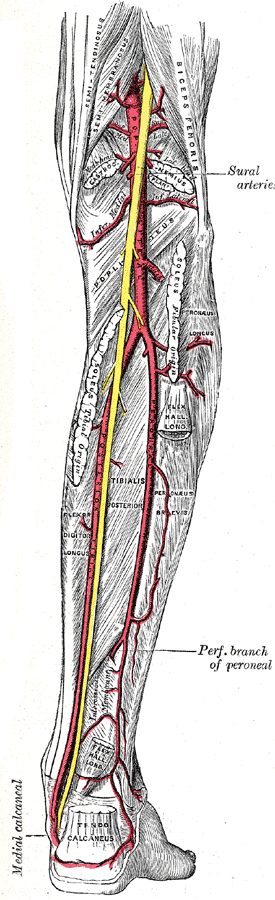
The popliteal, posterior tibial, and peroneal arteries.

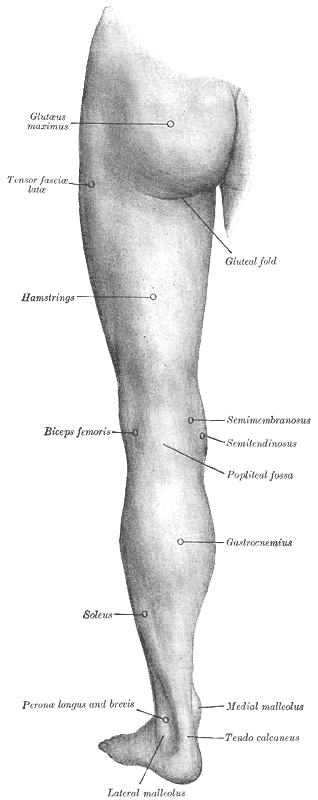
Back of left lower extremity.

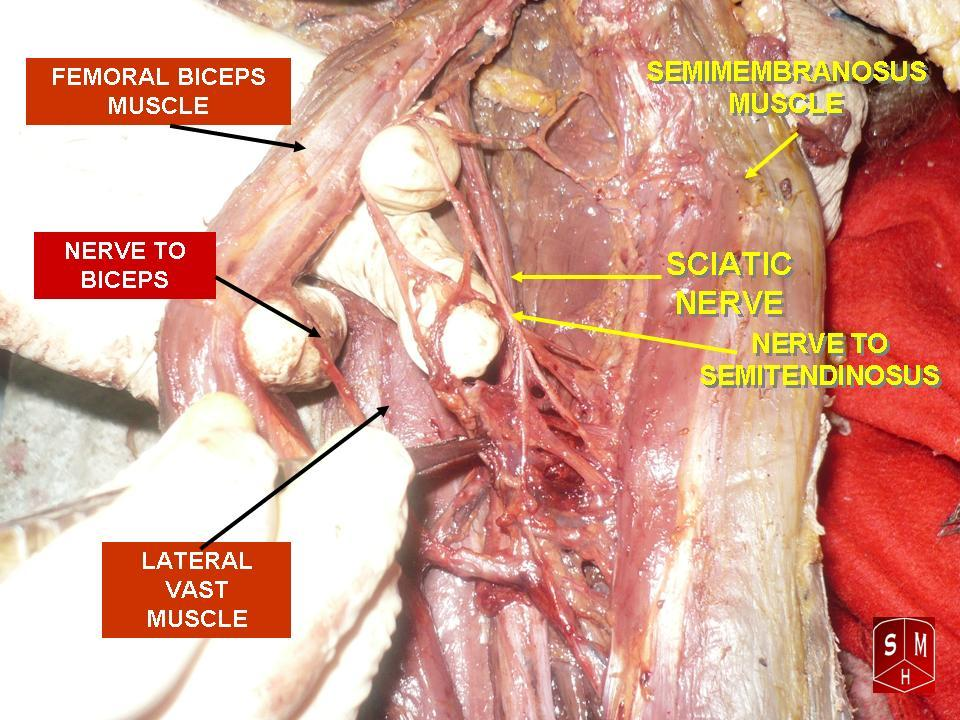
Semimembranosus muscle

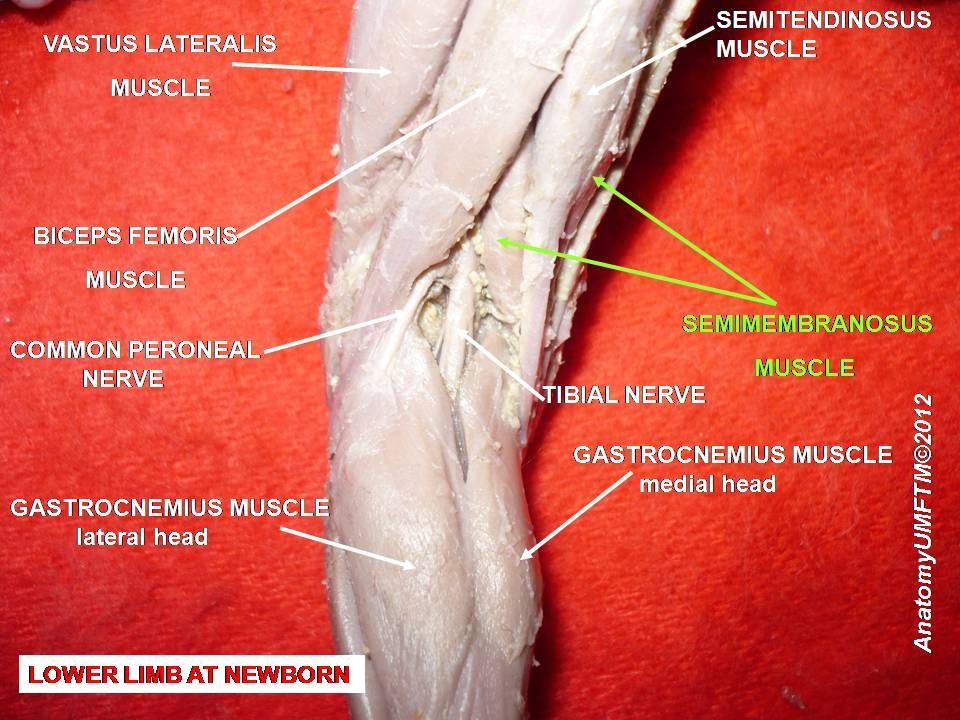
Semimembranosus muscle

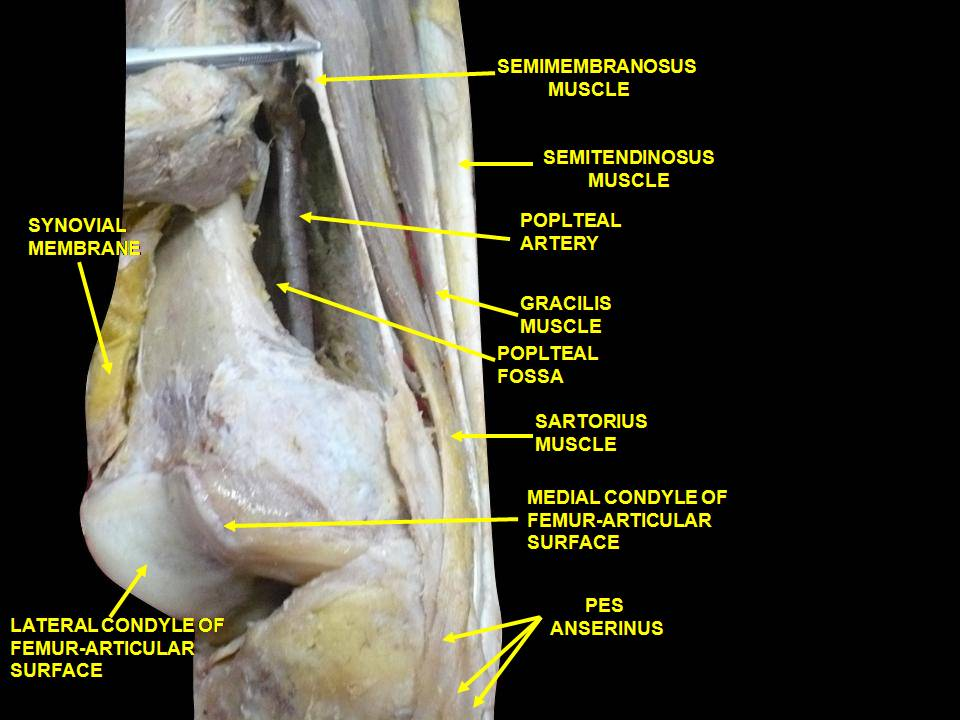
Muscles of thigh. Lateral view.

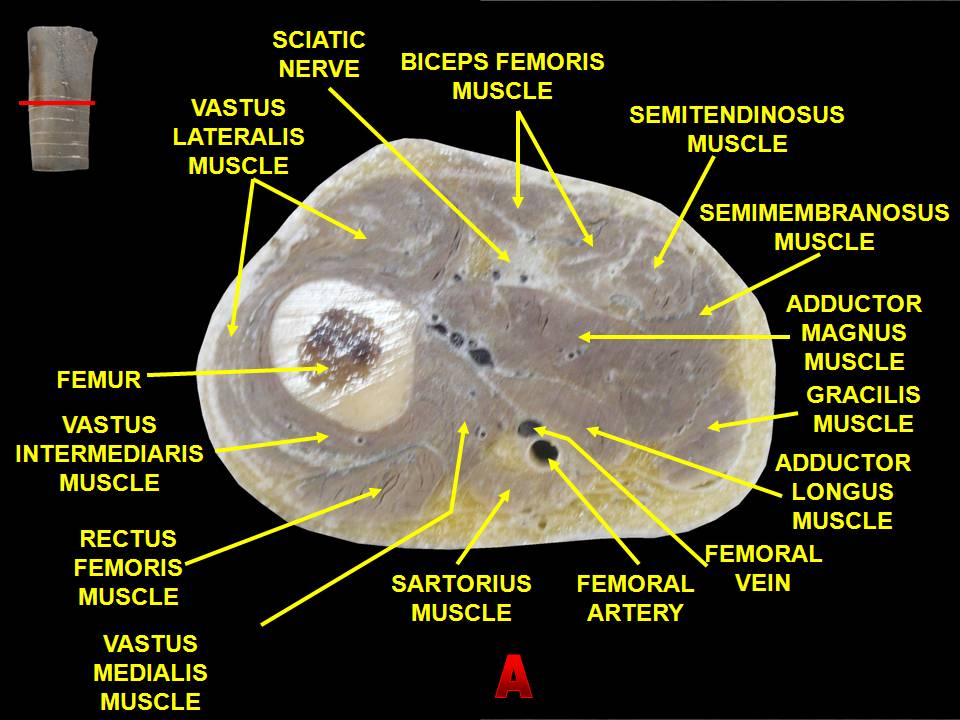
Muscles of thigh. Cross section.

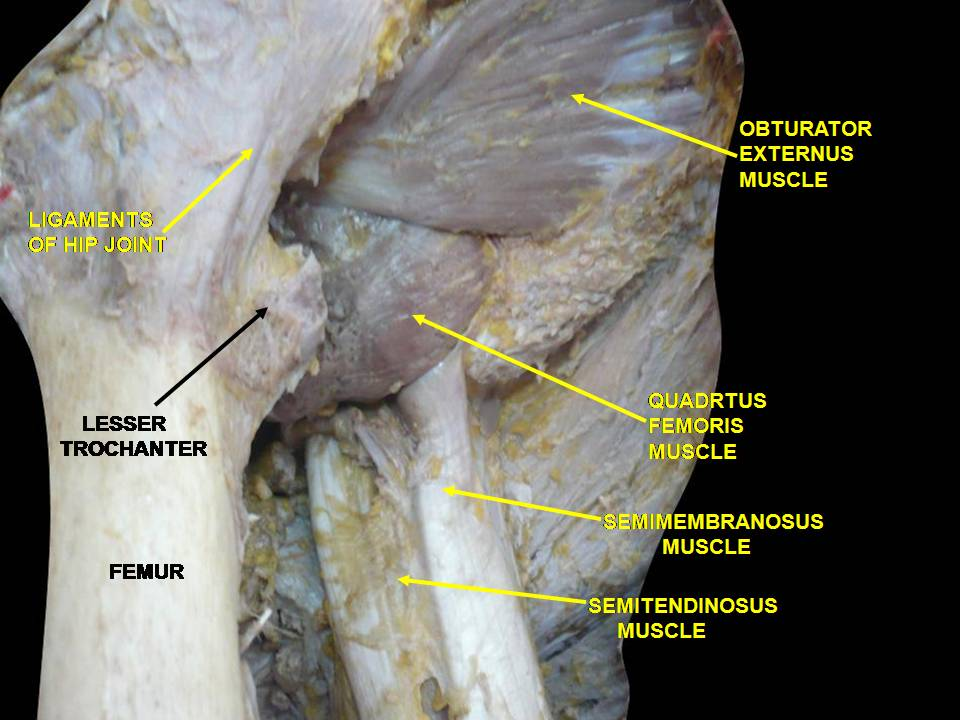
Muscles of thigh. Anterior views.

== See also ==
- Semitendinosus
- Biceps femoris
