= Gastrocnemius muscle =

Calf muscle

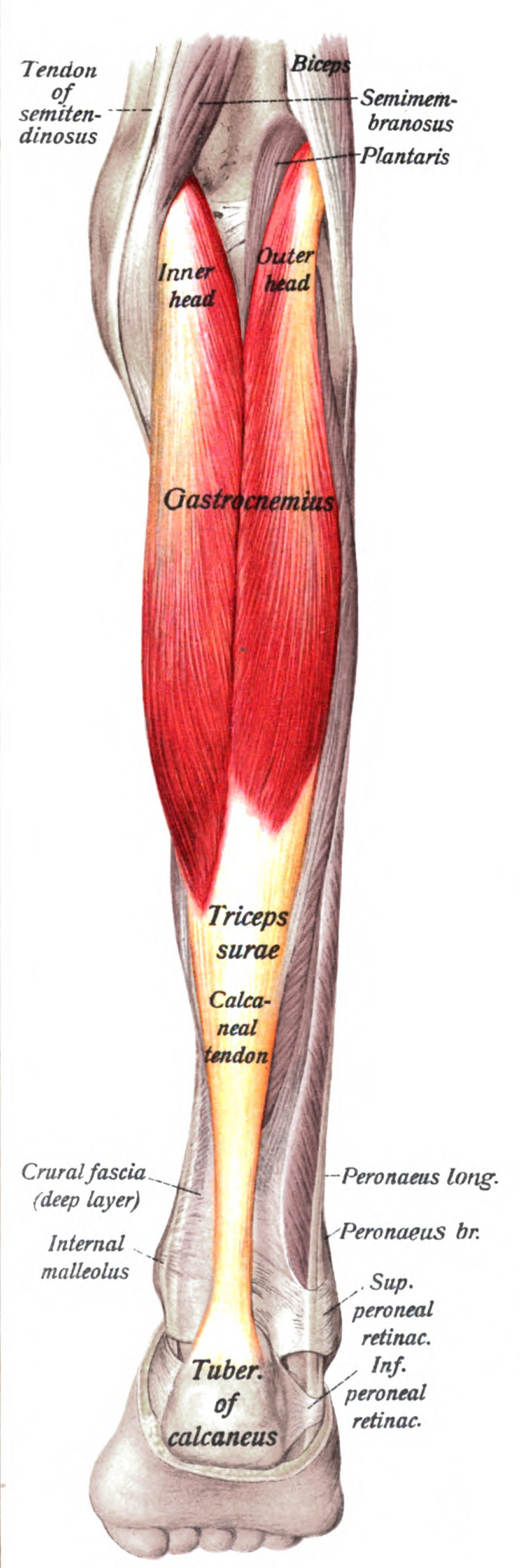
- Right leg seen from behind.
- Dissection video (2 min 44 s)

Details
- Pronunciation: /ˌɡæstrɒkˈniːmiəs/ or /ˌɡæstrəkˈniːmiəs/
- Origin: Proximal to articular surfaces of lateral condyle of femur and medial condyle of femur
- Insertion: Tendo calcaneus (Achilles tendon) into mid-posterior calcaneus
- Artery: Sural arteries
- Nerve: Tibial nerve from the sciatic, specifically, nerve roots S1–S2
- Actions: Plantar flexes foot, flexes knee
- Antagonist: Tibialis anterior muscle

Identifiers
- TA98: A04.7.02.044
- TA2: 2657
- FMA: 22541

The gastrocnemius muscle (plural gastrocnemii) is a superficial two-headed muscle. It is located superficial to the soleus in the posterior (back) compartment of the leg. It runs from its two heads just above the knee to the heel, extending across a total of three joints (knee, ankle and subtalar joints).

The muscle is named via Latin, from Greek γαστήρ (gaster) 'belly' or 'stomach' and κνήμη (knḗmē) 'leg', meaning 'stomach of the leg' (referring to the bulging shape of the calf).

== Structure ==
=== Origin/proximal attachment ===
The lateral head originates from the lateral condyle of the femur, while the medial head originates from the medial condyle of the femur.

=== Insertion/distal attachment ===
Its other end forms a common tendon with the soleus muscle; this tendon is known as the calcaneal tendon or Achilles tendon and inserts onto the posterior surface of the calcaneus, or heel bone.

=== Relations ===
The gastrocnemius is located posterior to (superficial to it) soleus in the posterior compartment of leg. It is considered a superficial muscle as it is located directly under skin, and its shape may often be visualized through the skin.

Beneath the gastrocnemius (farther from the skin) is the soleus muscle. Some anatomists consider both to be a single muscle—the triceps surae or "three-headed muscle of the calf"—since they share a common insertion via the Achilles tendon. The plantaris muscle and a portion of its tendon run between the two muscles, which is involved in "locking" the knee from the standing position. Since the anterior compartment of the leg is lateral to the tibia, the bulge of muscle medial to the tibia on the anterior side is actually the posterior compartment. The soleus is superficial to the mid-shaft of the tibia.

=== Variation ===
The third head of gastrocnemius muscle, also known as gastrocnemius tertius, is found in around 10% of the population. Thirty-nine percent of individuals have a sesamoid bone called the fabella in the lateral (outer) head of the gastrocnemius muscle.

== Function ==
Along with the soleus muscle, the gastrocnemius forms half of the calf muscle. Its function is plantar flexing the foot at the ankle joint and flexing the leg at the knee joint.

The gastrocnemius is primarily involved in running, jumping and other "fast" movements of leg, and to a lesser degree in walking and standing. This specialization is connected to the predominance of white muscle fibers (type II fast twitch) present in the gastrocnemius, as opposed to the soleus, which has more red muscle fibers (type I slow twitch) and is the primary active muscle when standing still.

=== Motor pathway ===
The plan to use the gastrocnemius in running, jumping, knee and plantar flexing is created in the precentral gyrus in the cerebrum of the brain. Once a plan is produced, the signal is sent to and down an upper motor neuron. The signal is passed through the internal capsule and decussates, or crosses, in the medulla oblongata, specifically in the lateral corticospinal tract. The signal continues down through the anterior horn of the spinal cord where the upper motor neuron synapses with the lower motor neuron. Signal propagation continues down the anterior rami (Lumbar 4-5 and Sacral 1-5) of the sacral plexus. The sciatic nerve branches off of the sacral plexus in which the tibial and common fibular nerves are wrapped in one sheath. The tibial nerve eventually separates from the sciatic nerve and innervates the gastrocnemius muscle.

== Clinical significance ==
The gastrocnemius muscle is prone to spasms, which are painful, involuntary contractions of the muscle that may last several minutes.

A severe ankle dorsiflexion force may result in a Medial Gastrocnemius Strain (MGS) injury of the muscle, commonly referred to as a "torn" or "strained" calf muscle, which is acutely painful and disabling.

The gastrocnemius muscle may also become inflamed due to overuse. Anti-inflammatory medications and physical therapy (heat, massage, and stretching) may be useful.

Anatomical abnormalities involving the medial head of gastrocnemius muscle result in popliteal artery entrapment syndrome.

== History ==
In a 1967 EMG study, Herman and Bragin concluded that its most important role was plantar flexing in large contractions and in rapid development of tension.

== Additional images ==
Animation

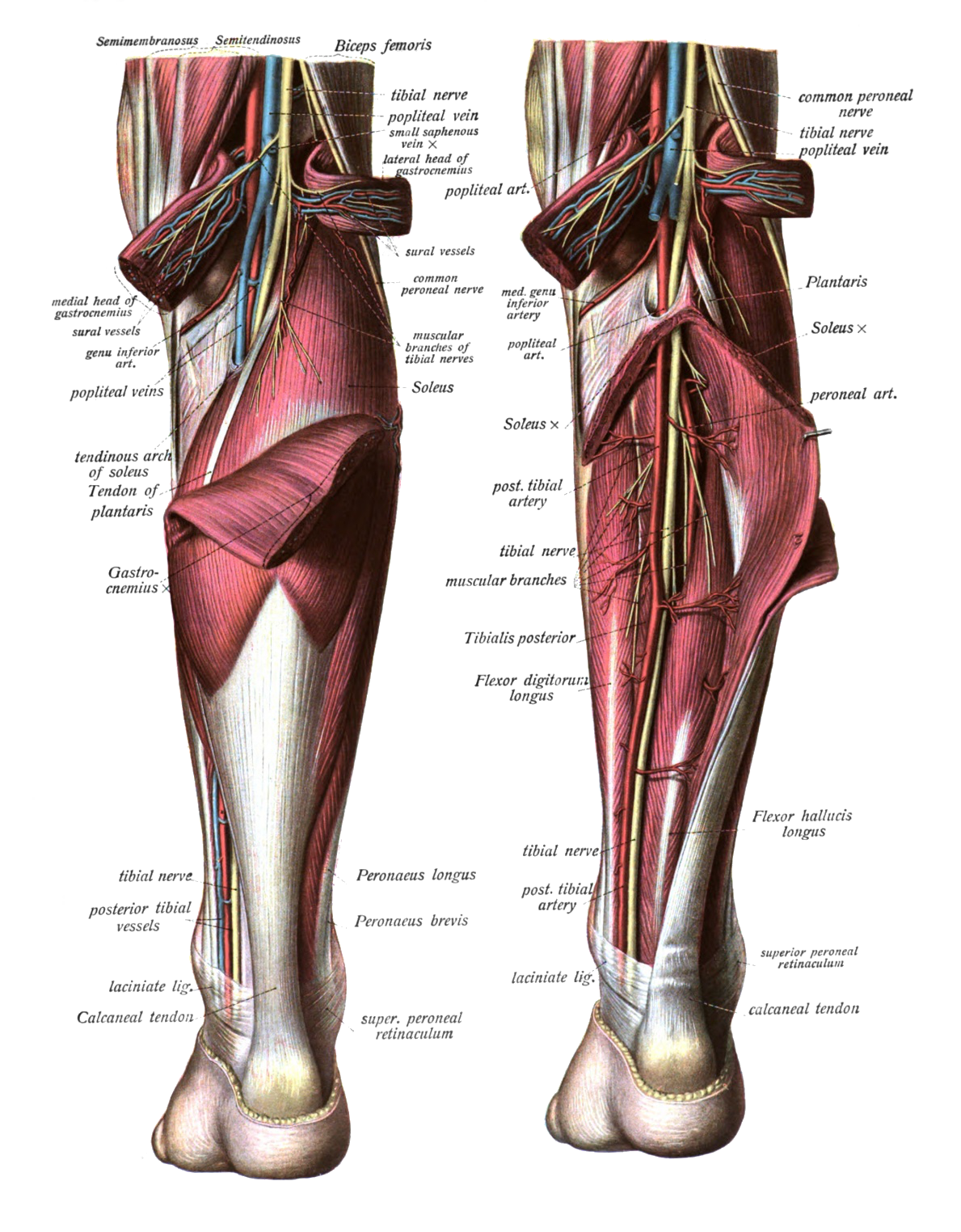
Nerves, arteries and veins surrounding the gastrocnemius and soleus.

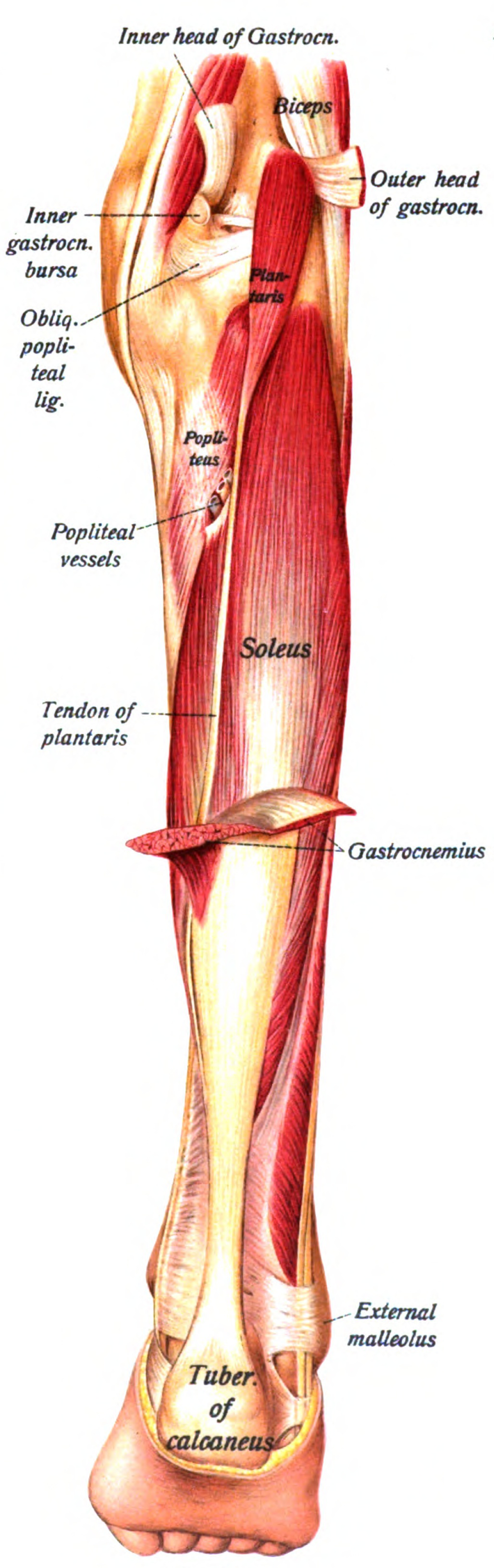
Muscle layer under the gastrocnemius

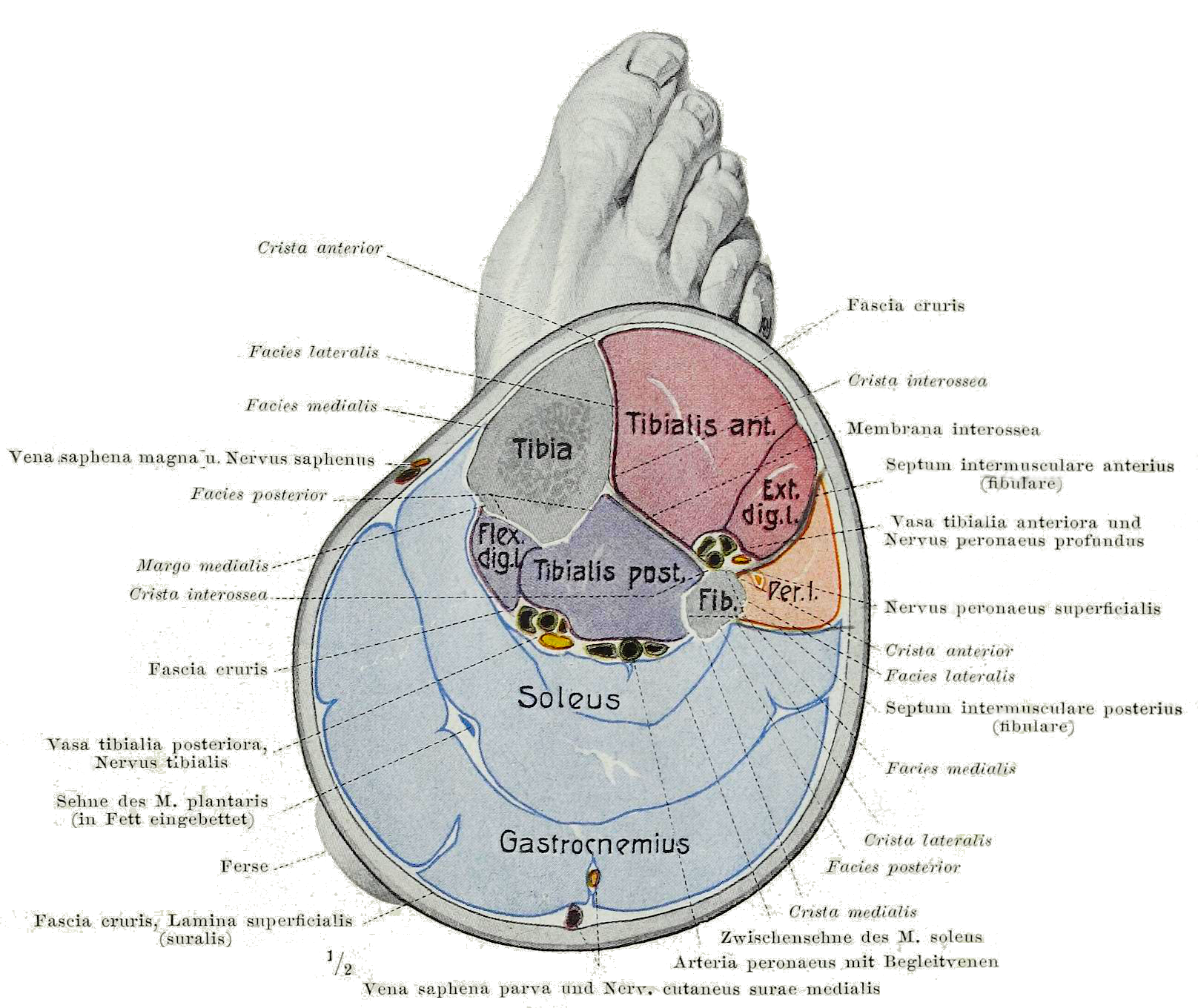
Cross section of the lower leg, showing the gastrocnemius at the back.

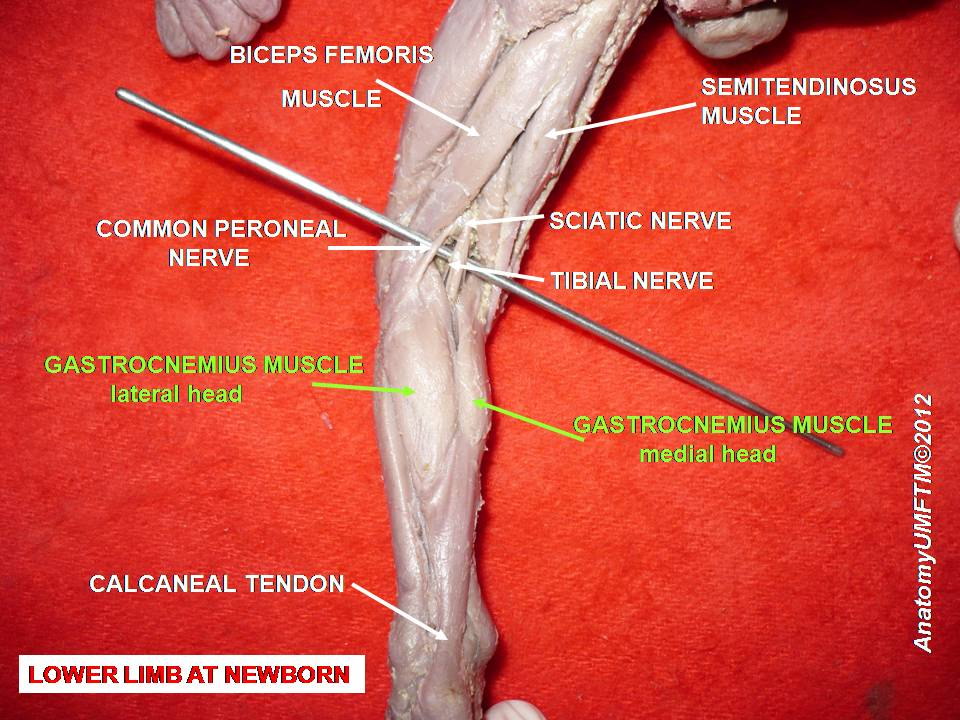
Gastrocnemius muscle (dissection)

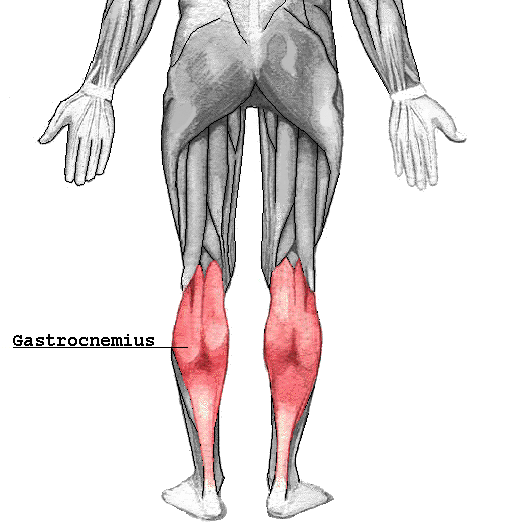
Location of muscle

== See also ==
- Calf raises
