= Medial inferior genicular artery =

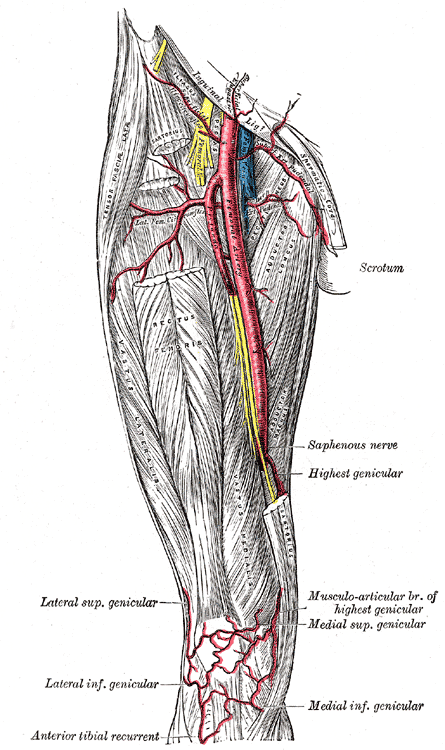
- The femoral artery. (Medial inf. genicular labeled at lower right.)

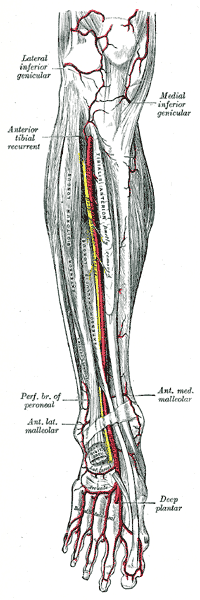
- Anterior tibial and dorsalis pedis arteries. (Medial inferior genicular labeled at upper right.)

Details
- Branches: Branch to popliteus
- Supplies: Upper end of the tibia, knee-joint

Identifiers
- Latin: arteria inferior medialis genus
- TA98: A12.2.16.039
- TA2: 4705
- FMA: 43889

The medial inferior genicular is an artery of the leg.

== Course ==
It first descends along the upper margin of the popliteus, to which it gives branches; it then passes below the medial condyle of the tibia, beneath the tibial collateral ligament, at the anterior border of which it ascends to the front and medial side of the joint, to supply the upper end of the tibia and the knee-joint, anastomosing with the lateral inferior and medial superior genicular arteries.

== See also ==
- Patellar anastomosis
