= Lateral superior genicular artery =

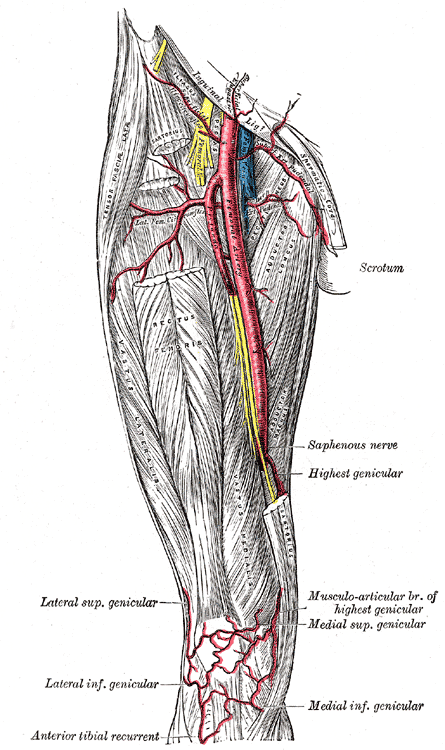
- The femoral artery. (Lateral sup. genicular labeled at bottom left.)

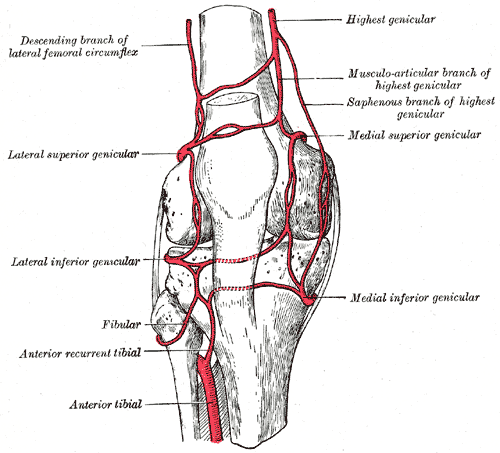
- Circumpatellar anastomosis. (Latter superior genicular labeled at upper left, second from top.)

Details
- Branches: Superficial branch, deep branch

Identifiers
- Latin: arteria superior lateralis genus
- TA98: A12.2.16.034
- TA2: 4700
- FMA: 22585

The lateral superior genicular artery is a branch of the popliteal artery that supplies a portion of the knee joint.

== Anatomy ==
=== Course and relations ===
It passes above the lateral condyle of the femur. It runs deep to the tendon of the biceps femoris.

=== Branches ===
It divides into a superficial and a deep branch; the superficial branch supplies the vastus lateralis, and anastomoses with the descending branch of the lateral femoral circumflex and the lateral inferior genicular arteries; the deep branch supplies the lower part of the femur and knee-joint, and forms an anastomotic arch across the front of the bone with the highest genicular and the medial inferior genicular arteries.

== Additional images ==
Schema of the arteries arising from the external iliac and femoral arteries.

== See also ==
- Patellar anastomosis
