= Dorsal nerve =

Dorsal nerve may refer to:

- Dorsal cutaneous nerve
- Dorsal digital nerves
- Dorsal digital nerves of foot
- Dorsal scapular nerve
- Dorsal nerve cord
- Dorsal nerve of clitoris
- Dorsal nerve of the penis
- Intermediate dorsal cutaneous nerve
- Lateral dorsal cutaneous nerve
- Medial dorsal cutaneous nerve
