= Fascial compartments of leg =

Four fascial compartments

- Cross-section through middle of leg. Four compartments painted in different colors.

- Muscles of the lower leg. Four compartments painted in different colors.

The fascial compartments of the leg are the four fascial compartments that separate and contain the muscles of the lower leg (from the knee to the ankle). The compartments are divided by septa formed from the fascia. The compartments usually have nerve and blood supplies separate from their neighbours. All of the muscles within a compartment will generally be supplied by the same nerve.

== Intermuscular septa ==
The lower leg is divided into four compartments by the interosseous membrane of the leg, the anterior intermuscular septum, the transverse intermuscular septum and the posterior intermuscular septum.

Each compartment contains connective tissue, nerves and blood vessels. The septa are formed from the fascia which is made up of a strong type of connective tissue. The fascia also separates the skeletal muscles from the subcutaneous tissue. Due to the great pressure placed on the leg, from the column of blood from the heart to the feet, the fascia is very thick in order to support the leg muscles. The thickness of the fascia can give problems when any inflammation present in the leg has little room to expand into. Blood vessels and nerves can also be affected by the pressure caused by any swelling in the leg. If the pressure becomes great enough, blood flow to the muscle can be blocked, leading to a condition known as compartment syndrome. Severe damage to the nerve and blood vessels around a muscle can cause the muscle to die and amputation might be necessary.

== Compartments ==
Image	Compartment	Muscles	Neurovascular structures
	Anterior compartment	Tibialis anterior; Extensor hallucis longus; Extensor digitorum longus; Fibularis tertius	Deep fibular (peroneal) nerve and anterior tibial vessels
	Lateral compartment	Fibularis longus; Fibularis brevis	Superficial fibular (peroneal) nerve and fibular artery
	Deep posterior compartment	Tibialis posterior; Flexor hallucis longus; Flexor digitorum longus; Popliteus	Tibial nerve, posterior tibial artery and posterior tibial vessels such as the fibular artery
	Superficial posterior compartment	Gastrocnemius; Soleus; Plantaris	Tibial nerve

== Additional images ==
Animation

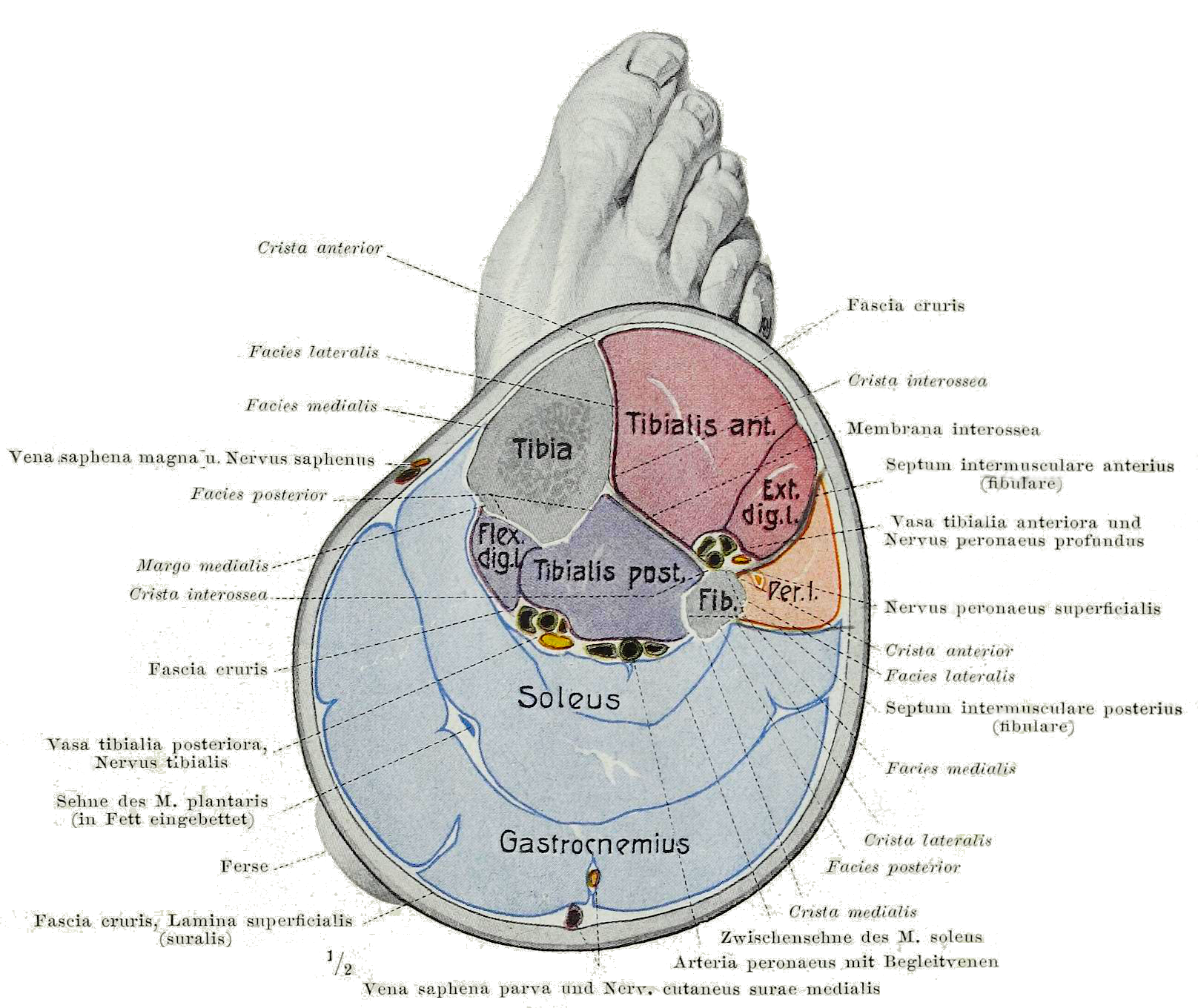
Cross-section of the right leg.

== See also ==
- Fascial compartments of arm
- Fascial compartments of forearm
- Fascial compartments of thigh
