= X-linked Charcot–Marie–Tooth disease =

- Other names: CMTX (abbr.)
- Specialty: Medical genetics
- Symptoms: Sensory loss alongside muscle abnormalities
- Complications: Accidental injuries
- Usual onset: Depends on the subtype, but most of them start in infancy or early childhood
- Duration: Lifelong
- Types: 1, 2, 3, 4, 5, 6
- Causes: Genetic mutation
- Prevention: None
- Prognosis: Medium
- Frequency: Rare: a limited number of families have been described in medical literature
- Deaths: -

X-linked Charcot–Marie–Tooth disease is a group of genetic disorders and a type of Charcot–Marie–Tooth disease characterized by sensory loss associated with muscle weakness and atrophy alongside many other symptoms.

== Signs and symptoms ==
Symptoms vary between subtypes, but generally they can be condensed into a basic summary: individuals with this condition have symptoms that, once present, progress over time (severity increases over time), these include: muscle weakness and atrophy of the distal extremities (mostly involving feet, legs, and the thenar eminence of the hands), loss of sensation of the distal limbs, loss of reflexes of the deep tendon, high-arched feet, and (less commonly) scoliosis.

Symptoms that are less frequent among X-linked CMT disease patients include dysfunctions of the transient central nervous system which are associated with dysphagia, dysarthria, ataxia, generalized body weakness, aphasia, and somnolence.

Severe cases might exhibit proximal muscle weakness.

== Complications ==
There are various complications associated with this condition, they are associated with the symptoms.

One example is the localized loss of sensation characteristic of this condition which also takes temperature sensation with it, this might be dangerous due to the fact that someone might accidentally injure themselves not knowing something is hot.

== Types ==
Although this condition is a type of Charcot–Marie–Tooth disease in on itself, it also has various subtypes with different symptoms, the following list comprises the 6 types of X-linked CMT:

- X-linked Charcot–Marie–Tooth disease type 1: This subtype is characterized by childhood-onset progressive severe muscle weakness and atrophy of the distal lower limbs and intrinsic hand muscles, bilateral foot drop, high-arched feet, hyporeflexia or areflexia of the tendons, and variable sensory loss of the lower limbs. Symptoms slightly less common than these ones include sensorineural deafness and problems of the central nervous system. It is inherited in an X-linked dominant manner.
- X-linked Charcot–Marie–Tooth disease type 2: This subtype is characterized by infancy/childhood-onset progressive distal muscle weakness with atrophy that affects both lower and upper extremities (although it affects the lower extremities the most), high-arched feet, and areflexia of the tendons. Symptoms that are slightly less common than these ones include sensory loss and intellectual disabilities. It is inherited in an X-linked recessive manner.
- X-linked Charcot–Marie–Tooth disease type 3: This subtype is characterized by childhood/adolescent-onset pain and numbness, progressive distal muscle weakness and atrophy which begins in the lower limbs and spreads to the upper limbs, distal upper and lower limb pain sensation loss, high-arched feet, and areflexia or hyporeflexia of the distal tendons. Spastic paraparesis has also been reported. It is inherited in an X-linked recessive manner.
- X-linked Charcot–Marie–Tooth disease type 4: This subtype is characterized by neonatal/early childhood-onset gradually progressive severe distal limb muscle weakness and atrophy (especially that affecting the peroneal muscles), sensory loss affecting upper and lower extremities (with the lower ones being affected the most), high-arched feet, generalized areflexia, and hammer toes. Sensorineural deafness and cognitive disabilities have been reported. It is inherited in an X-linked recessive manner.
- X-linked Charcot–Marie–Tooth disease type 5: This subtype is characterized by infancy/childhood-onset progressive distal limb muscle weakness and atrophy that affects both upper and lower extremities (although it is important noting that it appears and is more noticeable on the lower extremities), foot drop, gait abnormalities, bilateral severe/profound congenital hearing loss and progressive optic neuropathy. It is inherited in an X-linked recessive manner.
- X-linked Charcot–Marie–Tooth disease type 6: This subtype is characterized by childhood-onset gradual but progressive variable distal muscle weakness and atrophy affecting the lower extremities, distal limb panmodal sensorial anomalies, high-arched feet, claw toes, ankle areflexia, and steppage gait. It is inherited in an X-linked dominant manner.

== Genetics ==
This condition's causative X-chromosome gene depends on what subtype of CMTX one has, they are generally the following:

- Type 1: GJB1, located in Xq13.1
- Type 2: Xp22.2
- Type 3: Rearragement of chromosome 8q24.3 and Xq27.1.
- Type 4: AIFM1, located in Xq26.1
- Type 5: PRPS1, located in Xq22.3
- Type 6: PDK3, located in Xq22.11

== Diagnosis ==
This condition can be diagnosed through nerve biopsy, muscle biopsy, whole genome sequencing, alongside examination of symptoms exhibited by the patient.

== Treatment ==
Although Charcot–Marie–Tooth disease has no cure, it can be treated and managed by doing the following:

- Physiotherapy
- Occupational therapy
- Orthoses
- Walking aids
- Non-steroidal antiinflammatory medication
- Tricylic antidepressants or anti-convulsants

Treatment for physical deformities includes:

- Osteotomy
- Arthrodesis
- Plantar fascia release
- Spinal surgery

== Prognosis ==
Because of its X-linked nature, males with the condition tend to exhibit symptoms that are more severe than their female counterparts, who generally show very mild to no symptoms at all.

== Prevalence ==
Overall, it is estimated that 10-15% of all cases of Charcot–Marie–Tooth disease come from X-linked Charcot–Marie–Tooth disease. It is the second most common type of Charcot–Marie–Tooth disease.

According to OrphaNet, 1 out of every 100,000 people are affected by CMTX.

The following information comes from the OMIM pages for the 6 subtypes of CMTX

- Type 1: 30-50 families
- Type 2: 3 families
- Type 3: 2 families
- Type 4: 5 families
- Type 5: 7 families
- Type 6: 1 family
