= Calf =

Calf (pl.: calves) most often refers to:

- Calf (animal), the young of domestic cattle
- Calf (leg), in humans (and other primates), the back portion of the lower leg

Calf or calves may also refer to:

== Biology and animal byproducts ==
- Veal, meat from calves
- Calfskin, leather
- Vellum, calf hide processed as a writing material
- Calf-binding, a leather book binding

== Geography ==
- The Calf, a peak in the Yorkshire Dales, UK
- Calf, an island off Newfoundland; see Bull, Cow and Calf
- Calf, the product of Ice calving
- Calves, Portugal, a hamlet in Póvoa de Varzim, Portugal

== People ==
- Anthony Calf

== Other ==
- CALF, the Common Affordable Lightweight Fighter project
- Calf, short for calfdozer, a type of small bulldozer
- Calf, part of an early type of internal combustion engine seen in the Ascot (1904 automobile)

== See also ==
- List of animal names, for animals whose young are called "calves"
- Crus, the entire lower leg
- Calve (disambiguation)
- Calving (disambiguation)
- Calf Island (disambiguation)
- Golden calf, idol described in the Bible
- Cow–calf, a set of switcher-type locomotives
- Calf, a small island near a larger one; see Category:Calves (islands)
- Ilkley Moor, site of Cow and Calf Rocks
