= Crural intermuscular septum =

Crural intermuscular septum can refer to:

- Anterior crural intermuscular septum (Latin: septum intermusculare cruris anterius)
- Posterior crural intermuscular septum (Latin: septum intermusculare cruris posterius)
