= Calf (leg) =

Back part of lower leg

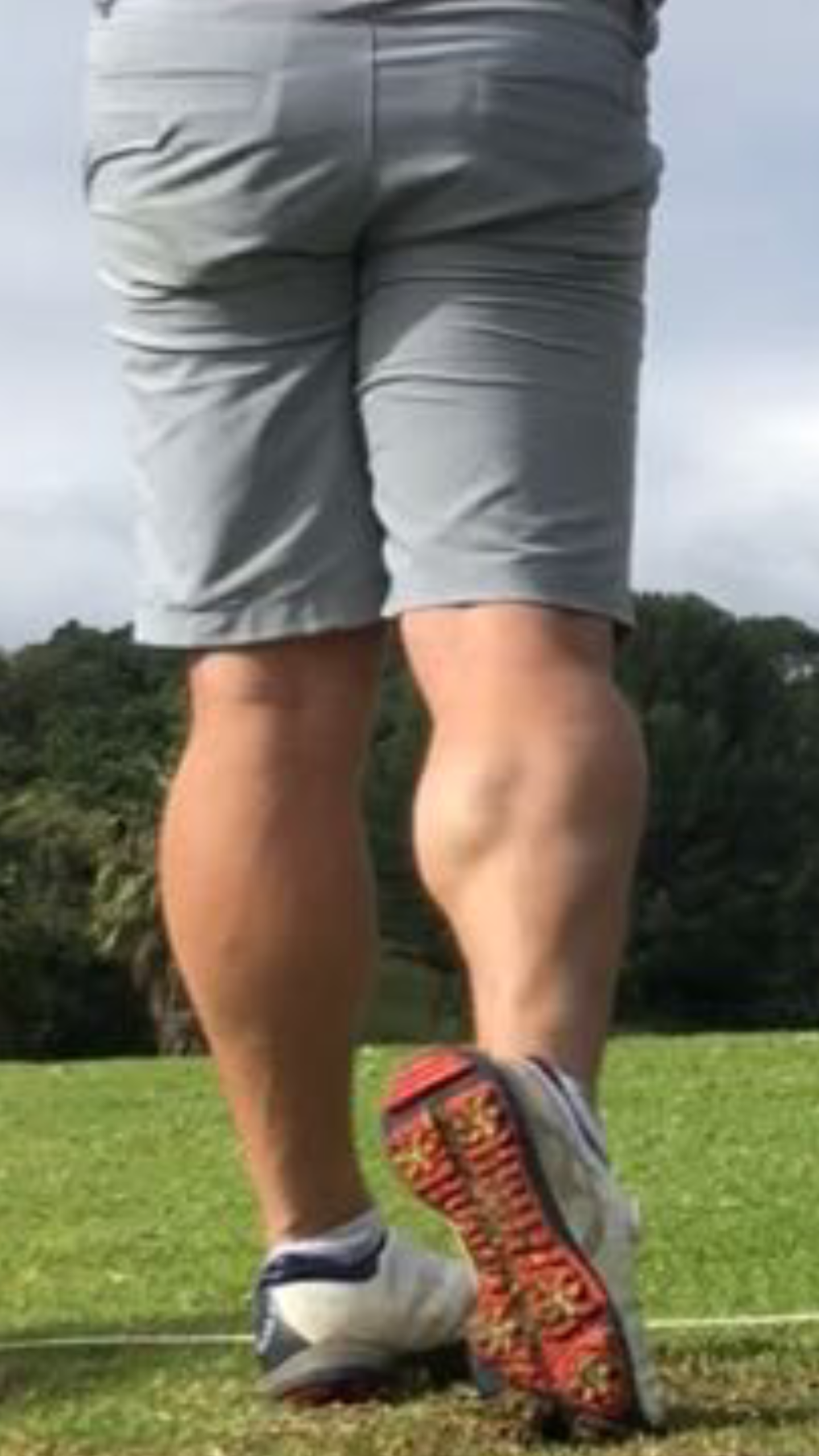
- The calf is the back portion of the lower leg

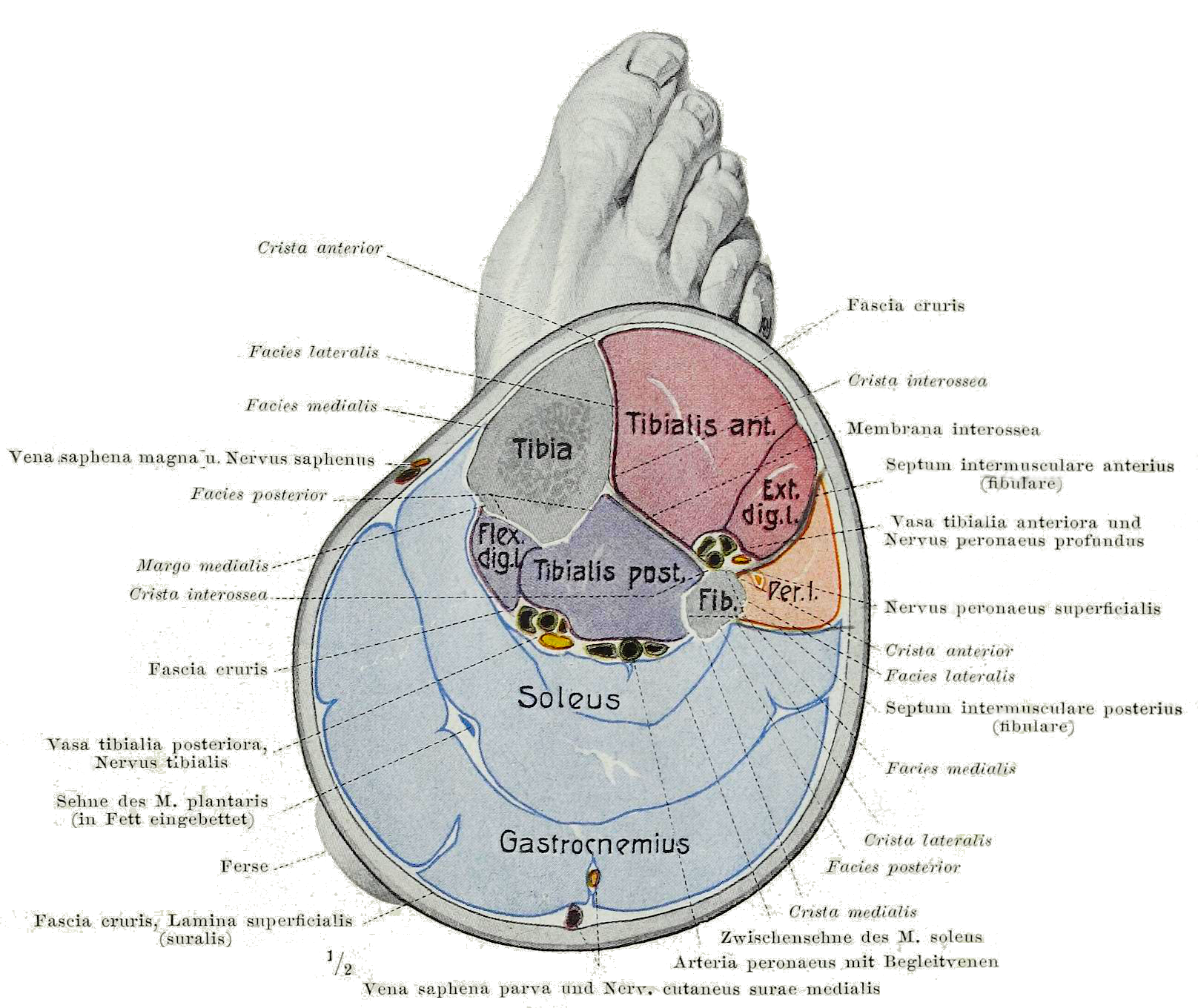
- Cross-section of lower right leg, through the calf, showing its 4 compartments: anterior at upper right; lateral at center right; deep posterior at center; superficial posterior at the bottom

Details

Identifiers
- Latin: sura
- Greek: acfle
- TA98: A01.1.00.039
- TA2: 164
- FMA: 22474

The calf (pl.: calves; Latin: sura) is the back portion of the lower leg in human anatomy. The muscles within the calf correspond to the posterior compartment of the leg. The two largest muscles within this compartment are known together as the calf muscle and attach to the heel via the Achilles tendon. Several other, smaller muscles attach to the knee, the ankle, and via long tendons to the toes.

== Etymology ==
From Middle English calf, kalf, from Old Norse kalfi, possibly derived from the same Germanic root as English calf ("young cow"). Cognate with Icelandic kálfi ("calf of the leg"). Calf and calf of the leg are documented in use in Middle English circa AD 1350 and AD 1425 respectively.

Historically, the absence of calf, meaning a lower leg without a prominent calf muscle, was regarded by some authors as a sign of inferiority: it is well known that monkeys have no calves, and still less do they exist among the lower orders of mammals.

== Structure ==
The calf is composed of the muscles of the posterior compartment of the leg: The gastrocnemius and soleus (composing the triceps surae muscle) and the tibialis posterior. The sural nerve provides innervation.

Distally, the gastrocnemius and soleus converge into the Achilles tendon (aka calcaneal tendon), which inserts onto the posterior surface of the Calcaneus (heel bone).

== Clinical significance ==
Medical conditions that result in calf swelling among other symptoms include deep vein thrombosis compartment syndrome, Achilles tendon rupture, and varicose veins.

Idiopathic leg cramps are common and typically affect the calf muscles at night. Edema also is common and in many cases idiopathic. In a small study of factory workers in good health, wearing compression garments helped to reduce edema and the pain associated with edema. A small study of runners found that wearing knee-high compression stockings while running significantly improved performance.

The circumference of the calf has been used to estimate selected health risks. In Spain, a study of 22,000 persons 65 or older found that a smaller calf circumference was associated with a higher risk of undernutrition. In France, a study of 6265 persons 65 or older found an inverse correlation between calf circumference and carotid plaques.

Calf augmentation and restoration is available, using a range of prosthesis devices and surgical techniques.

== Training and exercise ==
The calves can be isolated by performing movements involving plantarflexion (pointing the toes down). The two major categories of calf exercises are those that maintain an extended knee, and those that maintain a flexed knee.

The first category includes movements such as standing calf raises, donkey calf raises and stair calves. The second category includes movements that maintain a bent knee, such as seated calf raises. Movements with a straight knee will target the gastrocnemius muscle more, and movements with a bent-knee will target the soleus muscle more. However, both variations will target both muscles to a large degree.

It is important to train the calves relatively close to failure, which is 0-4 repetitions away from technical failure. They recover quickly, often requiring rest times of as little as 10 seconds and often no more than 60 seconds. Ensuring a 1-2 second pause at the top and bottom of the movement will put more emphasis on the muscle, and less emphasis on the achilles tendon.

== See also ==
- Calf (disambiguation)
- Calf raises
- Gastrocnemius muscle
- Human leg
- Sciatica
- Shin
