= Dorsal cutaneous nerve =

Dorsal cutaneous nerve may refer to:

- Intermediate dorsal cutaneous nerve
- Lateral dorsal cutaneous nerve
- Medial dorsal cutaneous nerve
