= Calve =

Calve may refer to:

- Calving (disambiguation)
- Calve Island, Scotland
- Calvé, surname

== See also ==
- Calf (disambiguation)
