= Intermuscular septums of the leg =

Intermuscular septums of the leg may refer to:

- Anterior intermuscular septum of leg, or anterior crural intermuscular septum is a band of fascia which separates the lateral from the anterior compartment of leg
- Deep transverse fascia, also known as transverse intermuscular septum of leg
- Posterior intermuscular septum of leg, or posterior crural intermuscular septum is a band of fascia which separates the lateral compartment of leg.
