= Posterior compartment =

Posterior compartment may refer to:

- Posterior compartment of arm
- Posterior compartment of leg
- rectum
