= Intermediate cutaneous =

Intermediate cutaneous may refer to:

- Intermediate cutaneous nerve of thigh
- Intermediate dorsal cutaneous nerve of the foot
