= Intermuscular septum =

Intermuscular septum can refer to:

- medial intermuscular septum of arm
- medial intermuscular septum of thigh
- lateral intermuscular septum of arm
- lateral intermuscular septum of thigh
- anterior intermuscular septum of leg
- posterior intermuscular septum of leg
