= Anterior compartment =

Anterior compartment may refer to:

- Anterior compartment of the forearm
- Anterior compartment of leg
- Anterior compartment of thigh
