= Extensor digitorum muscle of feet =

Extensor digitorum muscle of feet may refer to:

- Extensor digitorum brevis muscle
- Extensor digitorum longus muscle
