= Hallucis brevis muscle =

Hallucis brevis muscle may refer to:

- Extensor hallucis brevis muscle
- Flexor hallucis brevis muscle
