= Common fibular nerve =

Nerve in the lower leg

Common fibular (peroneal) nerve
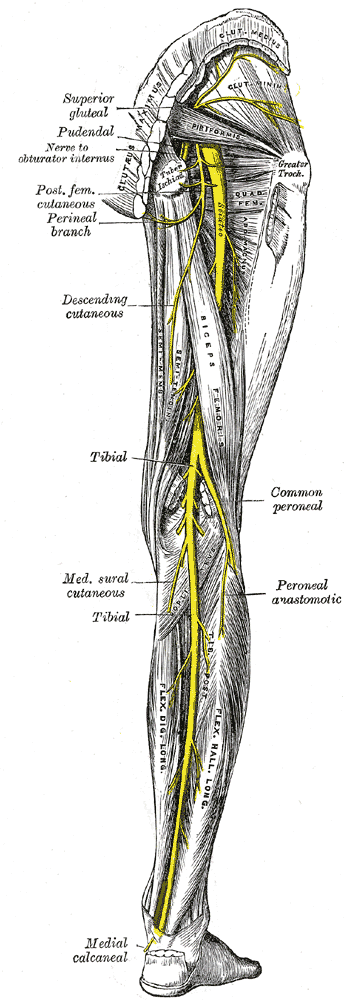
- Nerves of the right lower extremity, posterior view. (Common peroneal labeled at center right.)

Details
- From: Sacral plexus via sciatic nerve (L4-S2)
- To: Deep fibular nerve and superficial fibular nerve
- Innervates: Anterior compartment of leg, lateral compartment of leg, extensor digitorum brevis

Identifiers
- Latin: nervus fibularis communis, nervus peroneus communis
- MeSH: D010543
- TA98: A14.2.07.047
- TA2: 6571
- FMA: 19039

The common fibular nerve (also known as the common peroneal nerve, external popliteal nerve, or lateral popliteal nerve) is a nerve in the lower leg that provides sensation over the posterolateral part of the leg and the knee joint. It divides at the knee into two terminal branches: the superficial fibular nerve and deep fibular nerve, which innervate the muscles of the lateral and anterior compartments of the leg respectively. When the common fibular nerve is damaged or compressed, foot drop can ensue.

== Structure ==
The common fibular nerve is the smaller terminal branch of the sciatic nerve. The common fibular nerve has root values of L4, L5, S1, and S2. It arises from the superior angle of the popliteal fossa and extends to the lateral angle of the popliteal fossa, along the medial border of the biceps femoris. It then winds around the neck of the fibula to pierce the fibularis longus and divides into terminal branches of the superficial fibular nerve and the deep fibular nerve. Before its division, the common fibular nerve gives off several branches in the popliteal fossa.

=== Cutaneous branches ===
- Lateral sural cutaneous nerve (lateral cutaneous nerve of calf) - supplies the skin of the upper two-thirds of the lateral side of leg.
- sural communicating nerve - it runs on the posterolateral aspect of the calf and joins the sural nerve.

=== Articular branches ===
- Superior lateral genicular nerve - accompanies artery of the same name and lies above the lateral femoral condyle.
- Inferior lateral genicular nerve - accompanies artery of the same name and lies just above the head of the fibula.
- Recurrent genicular nerve - It arises from the point of division of the common fibular nerve; then ascends anterior to the knee joint together with the anterior recurrent tibial artery to supply the knee joint and the tibialis anterior muscle.

=== Motor branches ===
There is only one motor branch that arises directly from the common fibular nerve, the nerve to the short head of the biceps femoris muscle.

== Function ==
The common fibular nerve innervates the short head of the biceps femoris muscle via a motor branch that exits close to the gluteal cleft. The remainder of the fibular-innervated muscles are innervated by its branches, the deep fibular nerve and superficial fibular nerve.

It provides sensory innervation to the skin over the upper third of the lateral aspect of the leg via the lateral sural cutaneous nerve. It gives the sural communicating nerve which joins the sural nerve in the midcalf.

== Clinical significance ==
Chronic fibular (peroneal) neuropathy can result from, among other conditions, bed rest of long duration, hyperflexion of the knee, peripheral neuropathy, pressure in obstetric stirrups, and conditioning in ballet dancers. The most common cause is habitual leg crossing that compresses the common fibular nerve as it crosses around the neck of the fibula. Transient trauma to the nerve can result from peroneal strike, a fighting move aimed at the target's knee which causes a temporary disabling of the nerve.

Damage to this nerve typically results in foot drop, where dorsiflexion of the foot is compromised and the foot drags (the toe points) during walking; and in sensory loss to the dorsal surface of the foot and portions of the anterior, lower-lateral leg. A common yoga kneeling exercise, the Vajrasana, has been linked to a variant called yoga foot drop.

Surgical procedures involving the nerve involve:

- fibular (peroneal) nerve decompression
  - To surgically decompress the common fibular nerve, an incision is made over the neck of the fibula. Fascia surrounding the nerves to the lateral side of the leg is released.
- Deep fibular (peroneal) nerve decompression
  - In the surgical treatment of deep fibular nerve entrapment in the foot, a ligament from the extensor digitorum brevis muscle that crosses over the deep fibular nerve, putting pressure on it and causing pain, is released.

== Additional images ==
Front and posterior views of cutaneous nerves of the right lower extremity

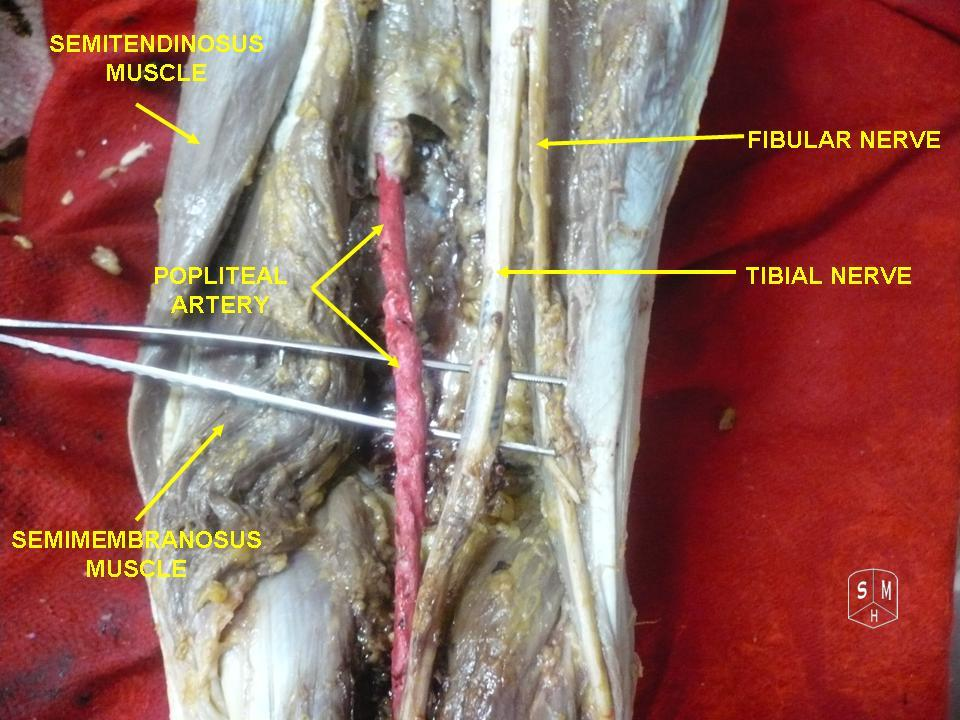
Common fibular (peroneal) nerve

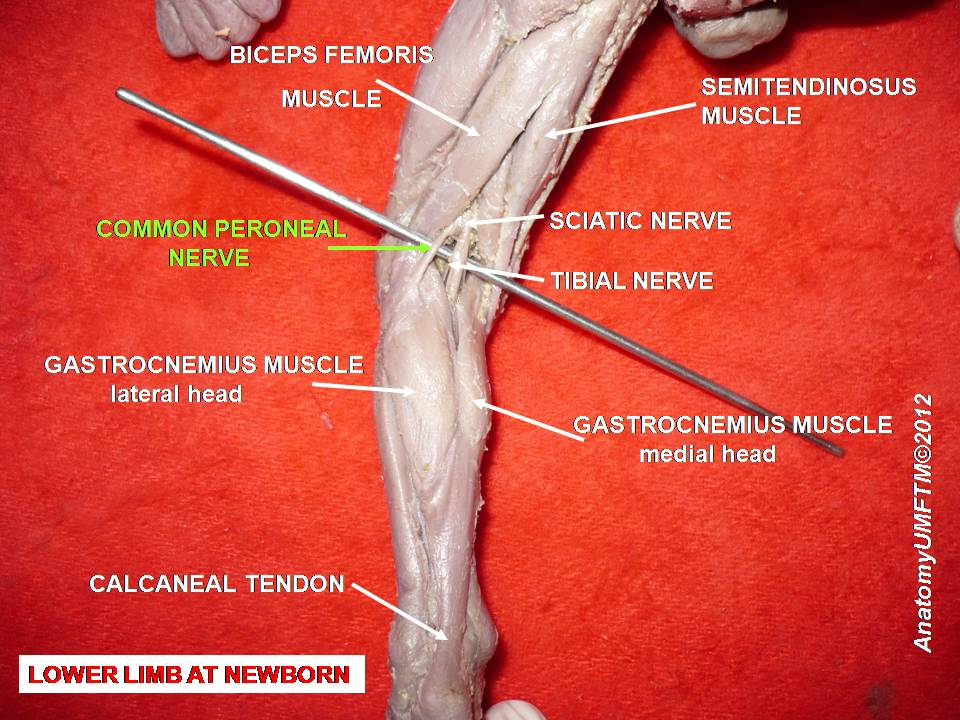
Common fibular (peroneal) nerve

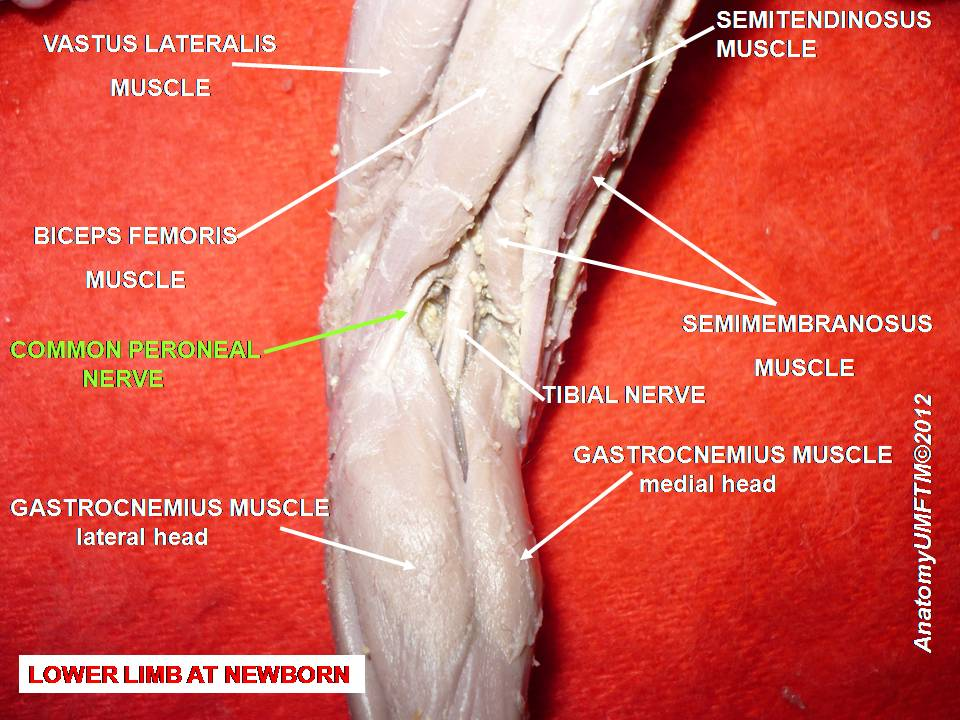
Common fibular (peroneal) nerve

== See also ==
- Deep fibular nerve
- Superficial fibular nerve
- Peroneal strike
- Fibular veins
- Sciatic nerve
- Nerve compression syndrome
- Nerve decompression
- Foot drop
