= Extensor hallucis muscle =

Extensor hallucis muscle may refer to:

- Extensor hallucis brevis muscle
- Extensor hallucis longus muscle
