= Steppage gait =

Type of gait abnormality

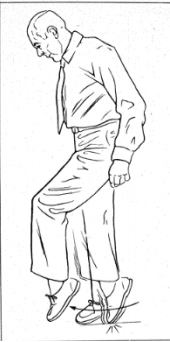
Diagram.

Steppage gait (high stepping, neuropathic gait) is a form of gait abnormality characterised by foot drop or ankle equinus due to loss of dorsiflexion. The foot hangs with the toes pointing down, causing the toes to scrape the ground while walking, requiring the walker to lift the leg higher than normal when walking.

Foot drop can be caused by damage to the deep fibular nerve.

== Conditions associated with a steppage gait ==
- Foot drop
- Charcot–Marie–Tooth disease
- Polio
- Multiple sclerosis
- Syphilis
- Guillain–Barré syndrome
- Spinal disc herniation
- Anterior Compartment Muscle Atrophy
- Deep fibular nerve injury
- Spondylolisthesis
- Slipped Femoral Epiphysis
- ALS/PLS
