= Lateral dorsal cutaneous nerve =

- Diagram of the segmental distribution of the cutaneous nerves of the sole of the foot.

- Cutaneous nerves of the right lower extremity. Front and posterior views.

Details
- From: sural nerve

Identifiers
- Latin: nervus cutaneus dorsalis lateralis
- TA98: A14.2.07.063
- TA2: 6587
- FMA: 44694

The lateral dorsal cutaneous nerve is the continuation/terminal sensory branch of the sural nerve, and is ultimately derived from the 1st sacral nerve (S1). It passes distally along the lateral part of the dorsum of foot. It gives rise to the lateral dorsal digital nerve of the 5th toe, and sometimes also the medial dorsal digital nerve of the 5th toe as well as the lateral dorsal digital nerve of the 4th toe (thus replacing branches of the intermediate dorsal cutaneous nerve).

== Anatomy ==
=== Origin ===
The sural branch becomes the lateral dorsal cutaneous nerve as it winds around/underneath the lateral malleolus.

=== Anastomoses ===
It anastomoses with the intermediate dorsal cutaneous nerve.

== Clinical significance ==
The course of this nerve influences the surgical approach to fixation of fractures of the fifth metatarsal, as the most direct surgical approach is at risk of damaging it.

== Additional images ==
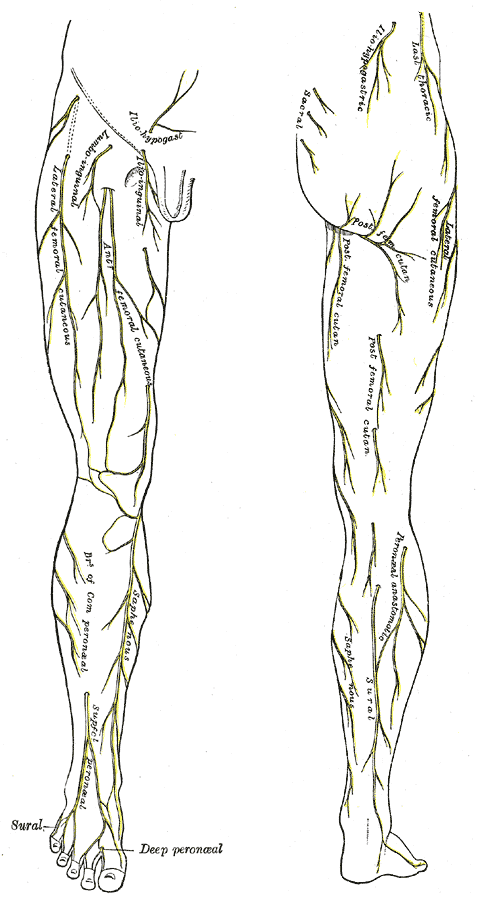
Cutaneous nerves of the right lower extremity. Front and posterior views.
