= Dorsal digital nerves =

Dorsal digital nerves may refer to:

- Dorsal digital nerves of foot
- Dorsal digital nerves of radial nerve
- Dorsal digital nerves of ulnar nerve
