= Superficial fibular nerve =

Nerve in the human leg and foot

Superficial fibular (peroneal) nerve
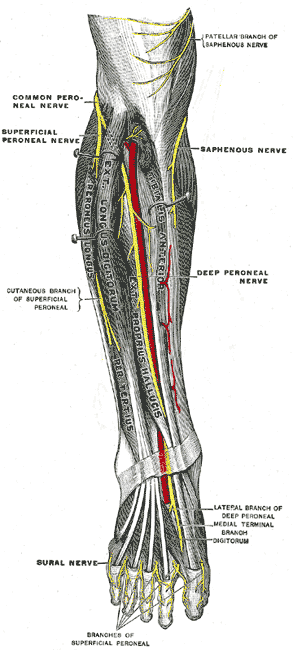
- Deep nerves of the front of the leg.

Details
- From: Common fibular nerve
- To: Medial dorsal cutaneous nerve, intermediate dorsal cutaneous nerve

Identifiers
- Latin: nervus fibularis superficialis, nervus peroneus superficialis
- TA98: A14.2.07.050
- TA2: 6574
- FMA: 44699

The superficial fibular nerve (also known as superficial peroneal nerve) is a mixed (motor and sensory) nerve that provides motor innervation to the fibularis longus and fibularis brevis muscles, and sensory innervation to skin over the antero-lateral aspect of the leg along with the greater part of the dorsum of the foot (with the exception of the first web space, which is innervated by the deep fibular nerve).

== Structure ==
=== Lateral side of the leg ===
The superficial fibular nerve is the main nerve of the lateral compartment of the leg. It begins at the lateral side of the neck of fibula, and runs through the fibularis longus and fibularis brevis muscles. In the middle third of the leg, it descends between the fibularis longus and fibularis brevis, and then reaches the anterior border of the fibularis brevis to enter the groove between the fibularis brevis and the extensor digitorum longus under the deep fascia of leg. It becomes superficial at the junction of upper two-thirds and lower one-thirds of the leg by piercing the deep fascia. The superficial fibular nerve gives off several branches in the leg.

- Muscular branches to fibularis longus and fibularis brevis
- Cutaneous branches supply the skin over the lower one-third of the lateral side of the leg and greater part of the dorsum of the foot except for areas that are supplied by the saphenous nerve (medial side of the leg), the sural nerve (lateral side of the foot), the deep fibular nerve (first webbed space of the dorsum of the foot), the medial, and the lateral plantar nerves (plantar surface of the foot).

=== Foot ===
At the junction between the upper two-thirds and lower one-thirds of the leg, the superficial fibular nerve is divided into medial dorsal cutaneous nerve (medial branch) and intermediate dorsal cutaneous nerve (lateral branch).

- The medial branch crosses the ankle and divides into two dorsal digital nerves—one for the medial side of the big toe, and the other for the adjoining sides of the second and third toes.
- The lateral branch divides into two dorsal digital nerves for the adjoining sides of the third and fourth toes and the fourth and fifth toes.
- Communicating branches: The medial branch communicates with saphenous nerve and the deep fibular nerve, while the lateral branch communicates with the sural nerve.

=== Distribution ===
The branches of the superficial fibular nerve supply the skin of the dorsal surfaces of all the toes excepting the lateral side of the little toe, and the adjoining sides of the great and second toes, the former being supplied by the lateral dorsal cutaneous nerve from the sural nerve, and the latter by the medial branch of the deep fibular nerve.

Frequently some of the lateral branches of the superficial fibular nerve are absent, and their places are then taken by branches of the sural nerve.

== Clinical significance ==
Injury to the nerve can result in an inability to evert the foot and loss of sensation over the dorsum of the foot (with the exception of the first web space between the great toe and the second toe, where the deep fibular nerve innervates).

== Additional images ==
Cutaneous nerves of the right lower extremity. Front and posterior views.

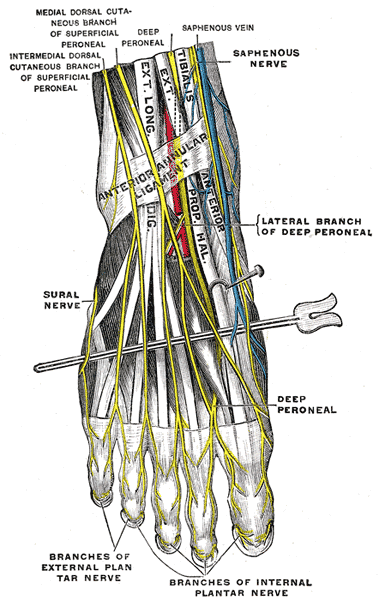
Nerves of the dorsum of the foot.
