= Peroneal strike =

Temporarily disabling blow

A peroneal strike is a temporarily disabling blow to the common fibular (peroneal) nerve of the leg, just above the knee. The attacker aims roughly a hand span above the exterior side of the knee, towards the back of the leg. This causes a temporary loss of motor control of the leg, accompanied by numbness and a painful tingling sensation from the point of impact all the way down the leg, usually lasting anywhere from 30 seconds to 5 hours in duration.

The strike is commonly made with the knee, a baton, or shin kick, but can be done by anything forcefully impacting the nerve. The technique is a part of the pressure point control tactics used in martial arts and by law enforcement agents.

The calf kick in MMA targets the peroneal nerve. A form of Low kick, the calf kick differs from ordinary low kicks by targeting the calf rather than the thigh. Because the swelling is contained to the calf muscle rather than the much larger quadriceps, swelling from calf kicks can compound quickly, affecting the peroneal nerve.

The peroneal strike was used against detainees during the 2002 Bagram torture and prisoner abuse scandal.

== See also ==
- Charley horse
- Pain compliance
- Kubotan
