= Vajrasana (yoga) =

Kneeling asana in modern yoga, a meditation asana in hatha yoga

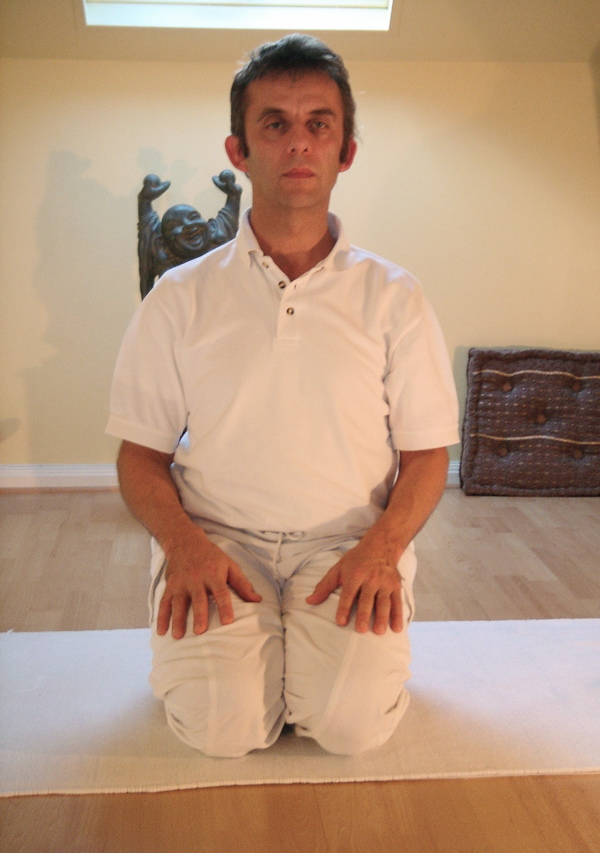
Vajrasana

Vajrasana (Sanskrit: वज्रासन, romanized: vajrāsana), Thunderbolt Pose, or Diamond Pose, is a kneeling asana in hatha yoga and modern yoga as exercise. Ancient texts describe a variety of poses under this name.

== Etymology and origins ==
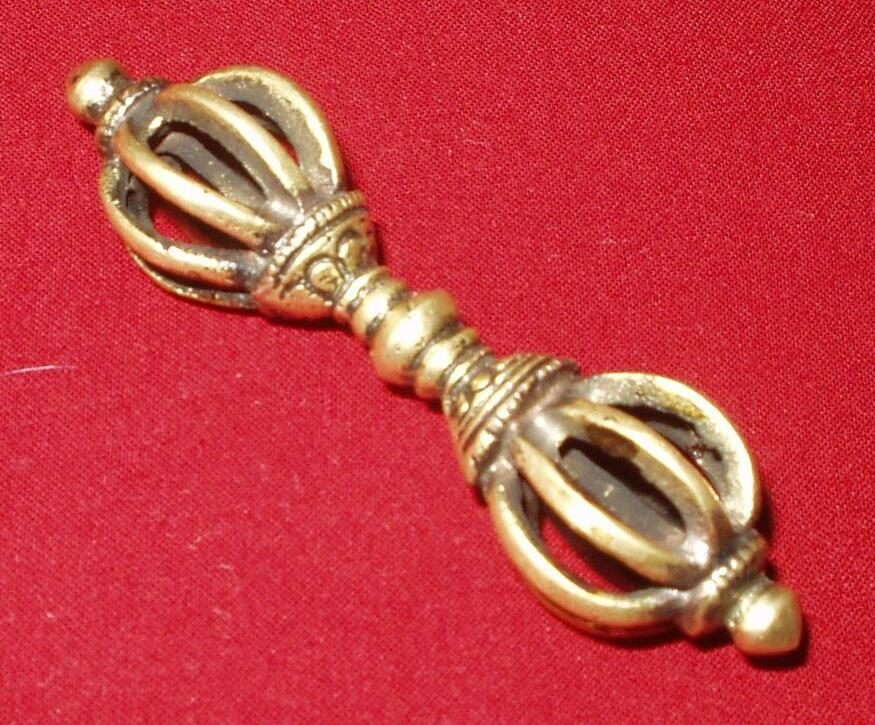
A Tibetan vajra

The name comes from the Sanskrit words vajra, a weapon whose name means "thunderbolt" or "diamond", and asana (आसन, āsana) meaning "posture" or "seat".

The name Vajrasana denotes a medieval meditation seat, but its usage varied. The 15th century Hatha Yoga Pradipika called it a synonym of Siddhasana, where one of the heels presses the root of the penis; according to Yoga-Mimamsa III.2 p. 135, "when we remember the meaning of the word Vajra in Yogic literature...we can understand why...(siddhasana)...is also called Vajrāsana".

The 17th century Gheranda Samhita 2.12 describes what Light on Yoga calls Virasana, with the feet beside the buttocks, while in other texts Vajrasana appears to mean the modern kneeling-down position, with the buttocks resting on the feet. The yoga scholar Norman Sjoman notes that Light on Yoga is unclear here, as its account of Laghu Vajrāsana has the knees and feet together, but it does not describe the basic Vajrasana.

== Description ==
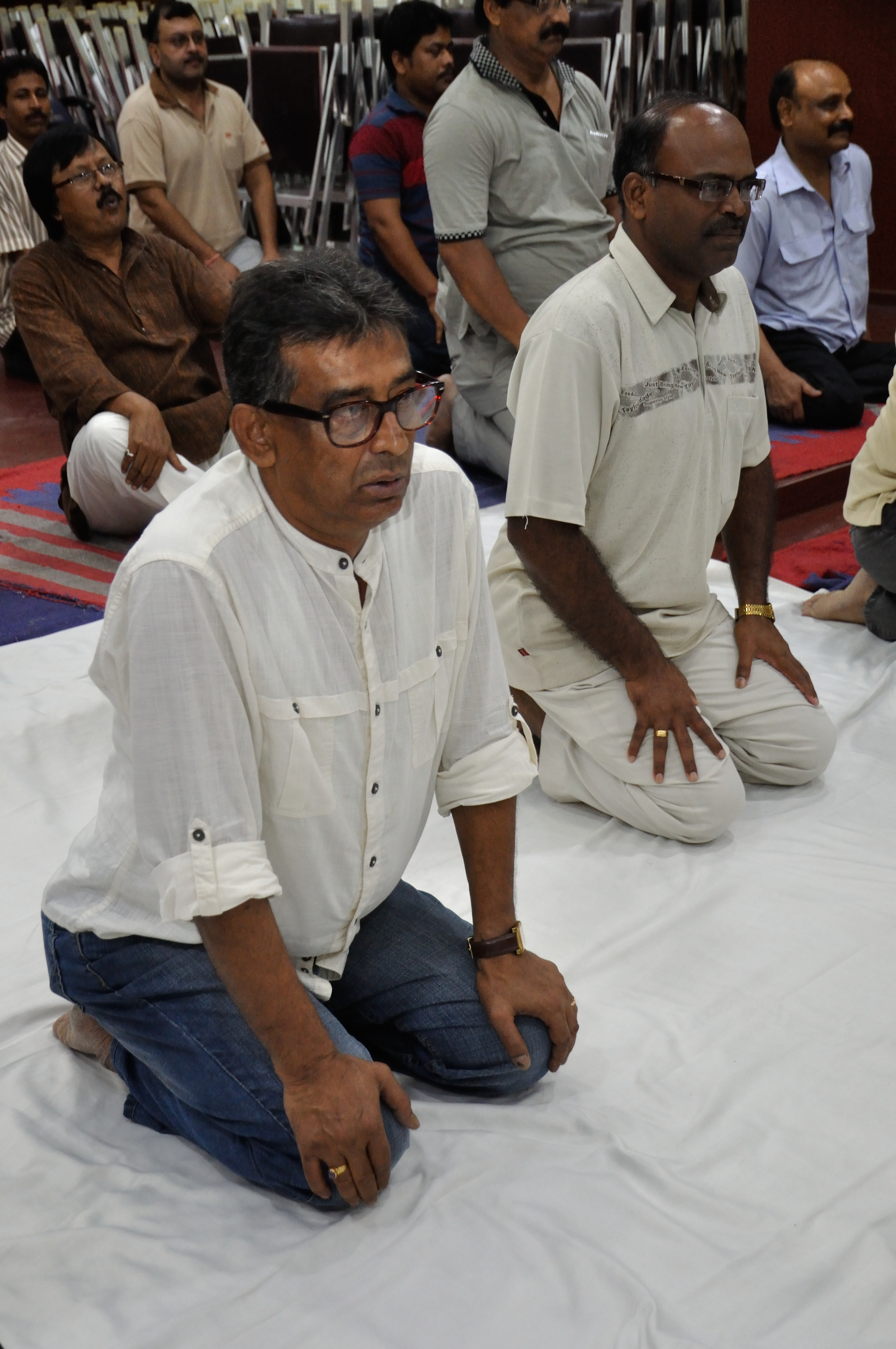
Side view, showing the heels and feet

The practitioner sits on the heels with the calves beneath the thighs. There is a four finger gap between the kneecaps, and the first toe of both the feet touch each other and sit erect.

== Variations ==
The reclining form of the pose, an intermediate pose in Ashtanga (vinyasa) yoga, is Supta Vajrasana.

Laghu-Vajrasana, an advanced pose in Ashtanga yoga and Iyengar Yoga, has the thighs raised halfway from the sitting position, the crown of the head on the floor and the hands grasping the ankles.

In his book Asana Pranayama Mudra Bandha, Swami Satyananda Saraswati has dedicated a whole series of asanas based on Vajrasana.

== Possible contraindications ==
Some orthopaedic surgeons claim Vajrasana may be harmful to knees. The pose has been linked to damage to the common fibular nerve resulting in foot drop, where dorsiflexion of the foot is compromised and the foot drags (the toe points) during walking; and in sensory loss to the surface of the foot and portions of the anterior, lower-lateral leg. In this context, one doctor has called it "yoga foot drop".

== See also ==
- List of asanas
- Seiza – Japanese traditional formal sitting posture
- Virasana – another kneeling asana, the name once also used for a cross-legged meditation asana
