= Calf Island =

Calf Island may refer to:

- Calf Island (Connecticut)
- Calf Island (Massachusetts)
- Calf Island (Michigan)
- Calf Island (New York), near Galloo Island

== See also ==
- Calf of Man
- Calf of Eday
- Calf of Flotta
