= Medial dorsal cutaneous nerve =

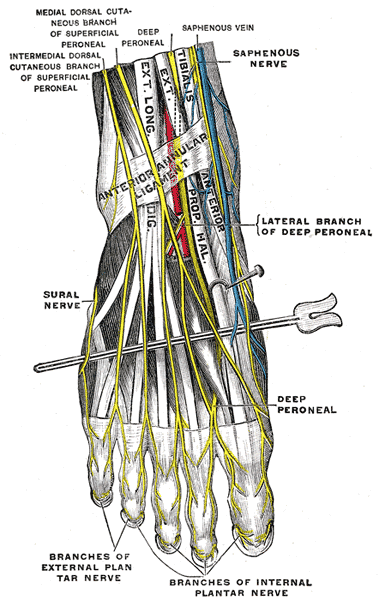
- Nerves of the dorsum of the foot. (Medial dorsal cutaneous labeled at upper left.)

Details
- From: superficial fibular nerve

Identifiers
- Latin: nervus cutaneus dorsalis medialis
- TA98: A14.2.07.052
- TA2: 6576
- FMA: 44809

The medial dorsal cutaneous nerve (internal dorsal cutaneous branch) is the more medial one of the two terminal branches of the superficial fibular nerve (the other being the intermediate dorsal cutaneous nerve). Through its branches, it provides innervation to parts of the dorsal aspects of the first, second, and third toes.

== Anatomy ==
=== Origin ===
The superficial fibular nerve terminates by bifurcating into the medial dorsal cutaneous nerve and the intermediate dorsal cutaneous nerve immediately after emerging from the deep fascia of leg at the distal two-thirds to three-fourths point of the leg.

=== Branches and distribution ===
The medial dorsal cutaneous nerves trifurcates at the inferior border of the ankle, giving rise to:

- a medial branch which passes anteromedially before giving rise to the medial dorsal digital nerves of the first toe;
- a middle branch which passes anteriorly superficial to the first intermetatarsal space and anastomoses with the tibial nerve before bifurcating in the distal portion of the intermetatarsal space to give rise to the lateral digital dorsal nerve of the first toe, and the medial digital dorsal nerve of the second toe;
- a lateral branch which passes anteriorly superficial to the second intermetatarsal space to give rise to the give rise to the lateral digital dorsal nerve of the second toe, and the medial digital dorsal nerve of the third toe.

It also supplies the integument of the medial side of the foot and ankle.

=== Anastomoses ===
It forms anastomoses with the saphenous nerve, and the deep fibular nerve.

== Additional images ==
Cutaneous nerves of the right lower extremity. Front and posterior views.
