= Calvé =

Calvé is a surname. Notable people with the surname include:

- Caroline Calvé (born 1978), Canadian snowboarder
- Emma Calvé (1858–1942), French opera singer
- Jean Calvé (born 1984), French footballer
