= Calving =

Calving may refer to:

- Calving, the process of giving birth to a calf
- Ice calving, the process by which an iceberg breaks off from an ice shelf or glacier
