= Posterior compartment of leg =

One of the fascial compartments of the leg

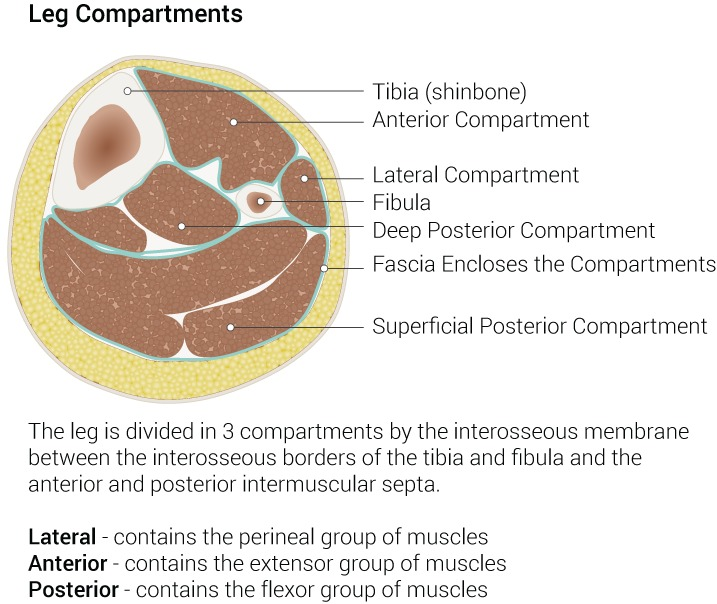
- Diagram of leg compartments
- Dissection video of posterior compartment of leg (6 min 39 sec)

Details
- Artery: Posterior tibial artery
- Nerve: Tibial nerve

Identifiers
- Latin: compartimentum cruris posterius
- TA98: A04.7.01.006
- TA2: 2654
- FMA: 45167

The posterior compartment of the leg is one of the fascial compartments of the leg and is divided further into deep and superficial compartments.

== Structure ==
=== Muscles ===
==== Superficial posterior compartment ====
Image	Muscle	Origin	Insertion	Innervation	Main Action !
	Gastrocnemius	Lateral head: lateral aspect of lateral condyle of femur Medial head: popliteal surface of femur; superior to medial condyle	Posterior surface of calcaneus via calcaneal tendon	Tibial nerve (S1, S2)	Plantarflexes ankle when knee is extended; raises heel during walking; flexes leg at knee joint
	Plantaris	Inferior end of lateral supracondylar line of femur; oblique popliteal ligament	Posterior surface of calcaneus via calcaneal tendon	Tibial nerve (S1, S2)	Weakly assists gastrocnemius in plantarflexing ankle
	Soleus	Posterior aspect of head and superior quarter of posterior surface of fibula; soleal line and middle third of medial border of tibia; and tendinous arch extending between the bony attachments	Posterior surface of calcaneus via calcaneal tendon	Tibial nerve (S1, S2)	Plantarflexes ankle independent of position of knee; steadies leg on foot

==== Deep posterior compartment ====
Image	Muscle	Origin	Insertion	Innervation	Main Action
	Flexor hallucis longus muscle	Inferior two-thirds of posterior surface of fibula; inferior part of interosseous membrane	Base of distal phalanx of big toe (hallux)	Tibial nerve (S1, S2)	Flexes big toe at all joints; weakly plantarflexes ankle; supports medial longitudinal arch of foot
	Tibialis posterior muscle	Interosseous membrane; posterior surface of tibia inferior to soleal line; posterior surface of fibula	Tuberosity of navicular, cuneiform, cuboid, and sustentaculum tali of calcaneus; bases of 2nd, 3rd, and 4th metatarsals	Tibial nerve (L4, L5)	Plantarflexes ankle; inverts foot
	Flexor digitorum longus muscle	Medial part of posterior surface of tibia; by a broad tendon to fibula	Bases of distal phalanges of lateral four digits	Tibial nerve (S1, S2)	Flexes lateral four digits; plantarflexes ankle; supports longitudinal arches of foot
	Popliteus muscle	Lateral surface of lateral condyle of femur and lateral meniscus	Animation. Posterior surface of tibia, superior to soleal line	Tibial nerve (L4, L5, S1)	Weakly flexes knee and unlocks it by rotating femur 5 deg on fixed tibia; medially rotates tibia of unplanted limb

=== Blood supply ===
Posterior tibial artery

=== Innervation ===
The posterior compartment of the leg is supplied by the tibial nerve.

== Function ==
- It contains the plantar flexors:

== Additional images ==
Superficial posterior compartment. Animation.

Deep posterior compartment. Animation.
