= Anterior intermuscular septum of leg =

Band of fascia which separates the lateral from the anterior compartment of leg

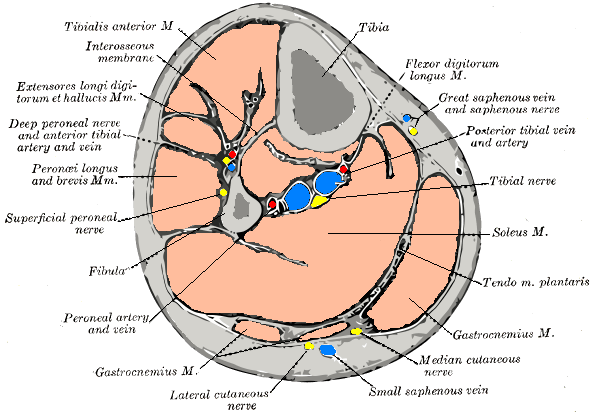
- Cross-section through middle of leg.

Details

Identifiers
- Latin: septum intermusculare cruris anterius
- TA98: A04.7.03.022
- TA2: 2709
- FMA: 58755

The anterior intermuscular septum of leg or anterior crural intermuscular septum is a band of fascia which separates the lateral from the anterior compartment of leg.

The deep fascia of leg gives off from its deep surface, on the lateral side of the leg, two strong intermuscular septa, the anterior and posterior peroneal septa, which enclose the peroneus longus and brevis, and separate them from the muscles of the anterior and posterior crural regions, and several more slender processes which enclose the individual muscles in each region.

== See also ==
- Posterior intermuscular septum of leg
