= Extensor digitorum brevis muscle =

Muscle on the upper surface of the foot that helps extend digits 2 through 4

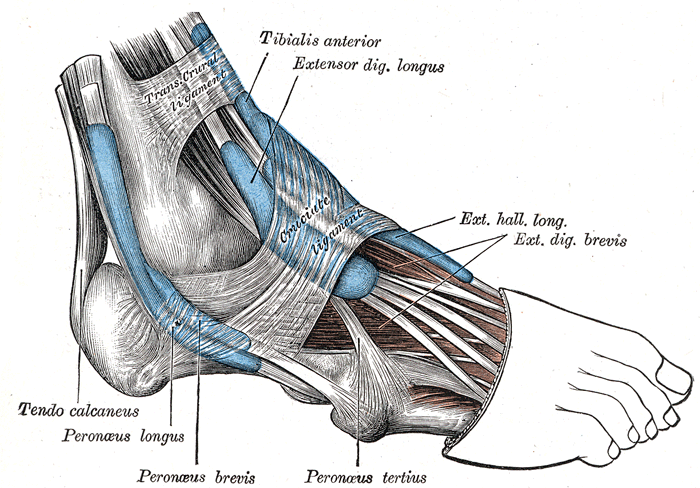
- The mucous sheaths of the tendons around the ankle. Lateral aspect. (Extensor dig. brevis labeled at upper right.)

- Animation

Details
- Origin: Dorsal surface of calcaneus
- Insertion: Proximal dorsal region of middle phalanges 2, 3 and 4
- Artery: Dorsalis pedis artery
- Nerve: Deep fibular nerve
- Actions: Extends digits 2 through 4
- Antagonist: Flexor digitorum longus, flexor digitorum brevis

Identifiers
- Latin: musculus extensor digitorum brevis
- TA98: A04.7.02.055
- TA2: 2671
- FMA: 51140

The extensor digitorum brevis muscle (sometimes EDB) is a broad and thin plane of muscular fibers situated on the dorsum of the foot, and dividing at its anterior end into four small tendons. It helps extend digits 1 through 4.

== Structure ==
The short extensor of the toes originates from the forepart of the upper and lateral surface of the calcaneus (in front of the groove for the fibularis brevis tendon), from the interosseous talocalcaneal ligament and the stem of the inferior extensor retinaculum. The fibres pass obliquely forwards and medially across the dorsum of the foot and end in four tendons. The medial part of the muscle, also known as extensor hallucis brevis, ends in a tendon which crosses over the dorsalis pedis artery and inserts into the dorsal surface of the base of the proximal phalanx of the great toe. The other three tendons insert into the lateral sides of the tendons of extensor digitorum longus for the second, third and fourth toes.

=== Nerve supply ===
Nerve supply: lateral terminal branch of Deep Peroneal Nerve (deep fibular nerve) (proximal sciatic branches L4-L5, but most clinically relevant L5 with L4/L5 spinal disc herniation causing L5 lesion). Same innervation of Extensor Hallucis Brevis.

== Function ==
Extensor digitorum brevis extends the first four digits at the metatarsophalangeal joint and assists in extending the second, third and fourth digits at the interphalangeal joint. The fifth digit, lacking any insertion from extensor digitorum brevis, can only be raised by the long extensor of the toes.

== Additional images ==
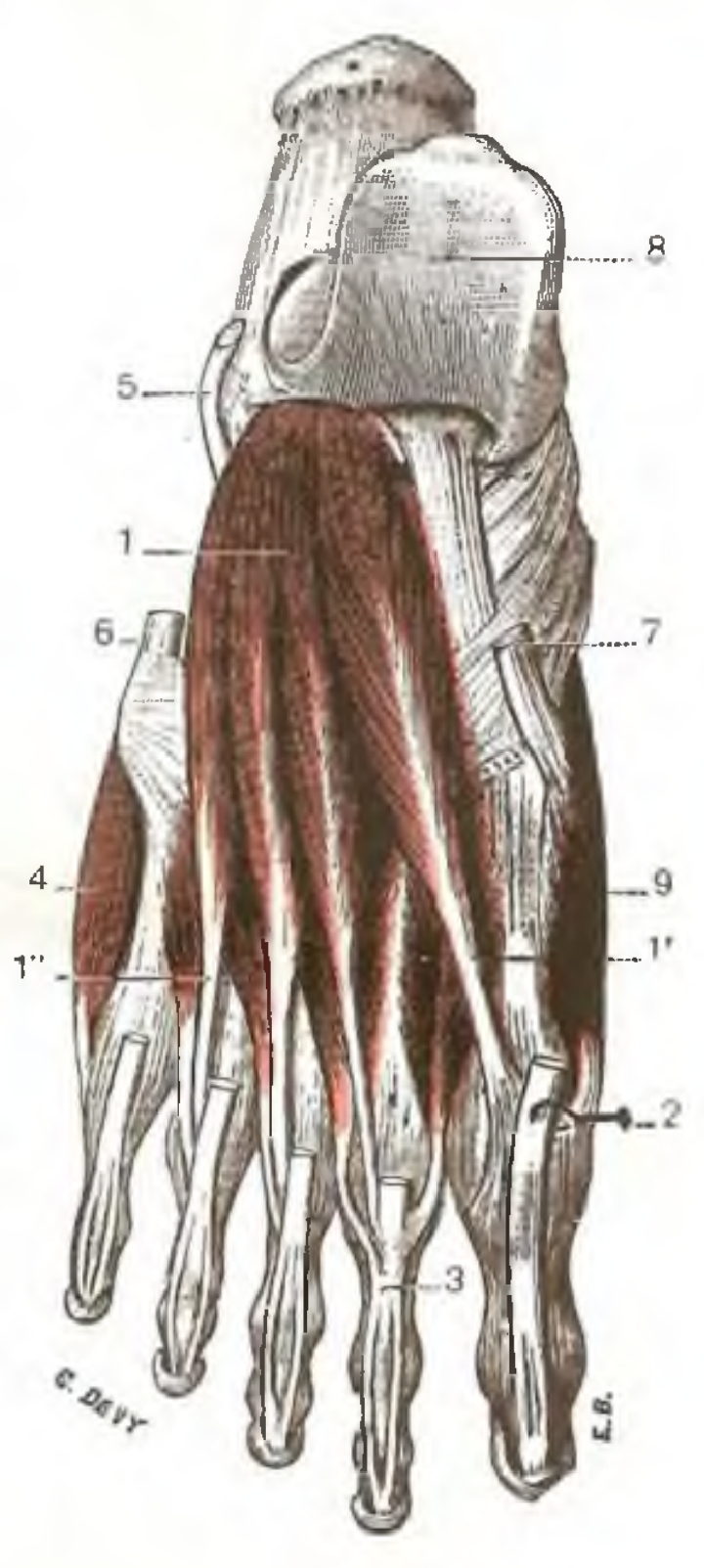
Dissected dorsum of the right foot, showing the extensor digitorum brevis muscle (labeled 1, 1' & 1"). Superior view. (From Testut's Anatomy.)

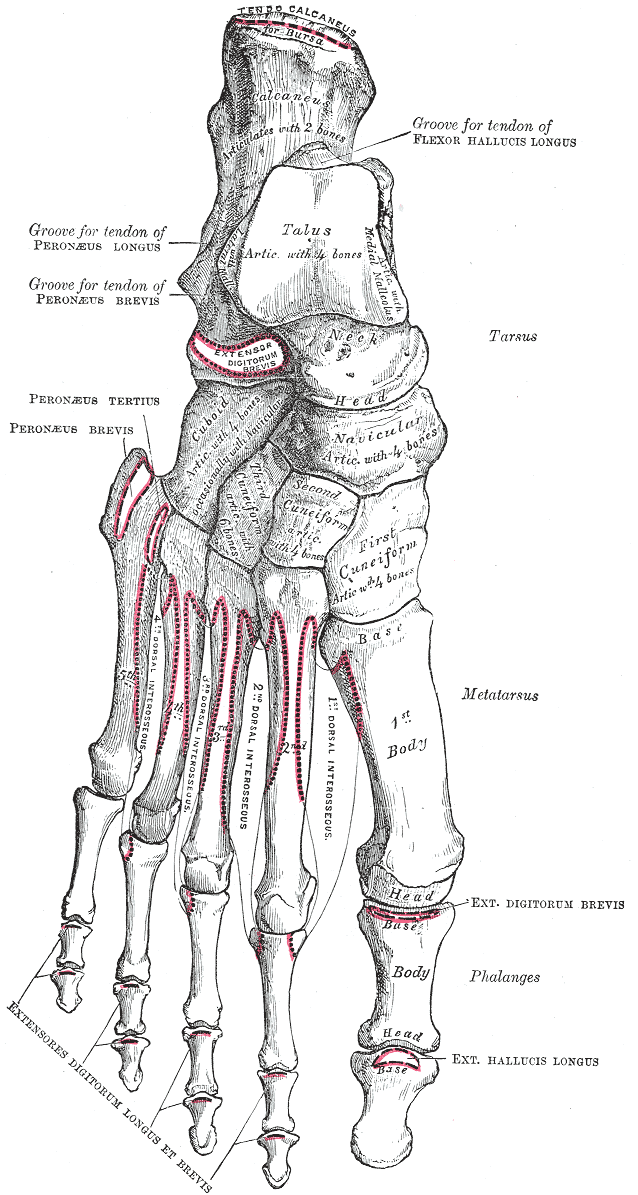
Bones of the right foot. Dorsal surface.

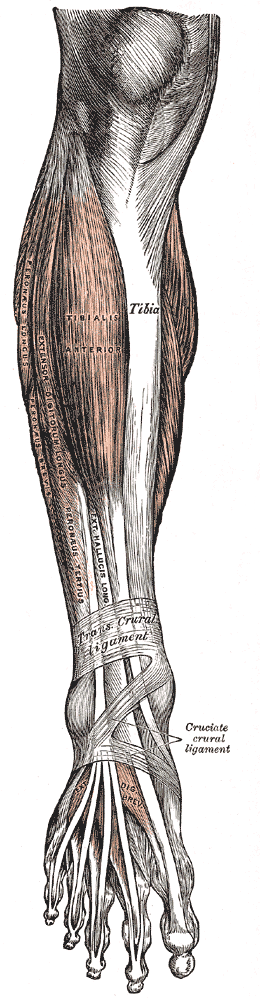
Muscles of the front of the leg.

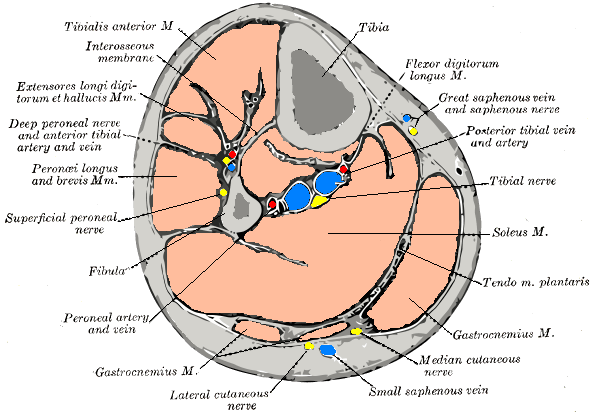
Cross-section through middle of leg.

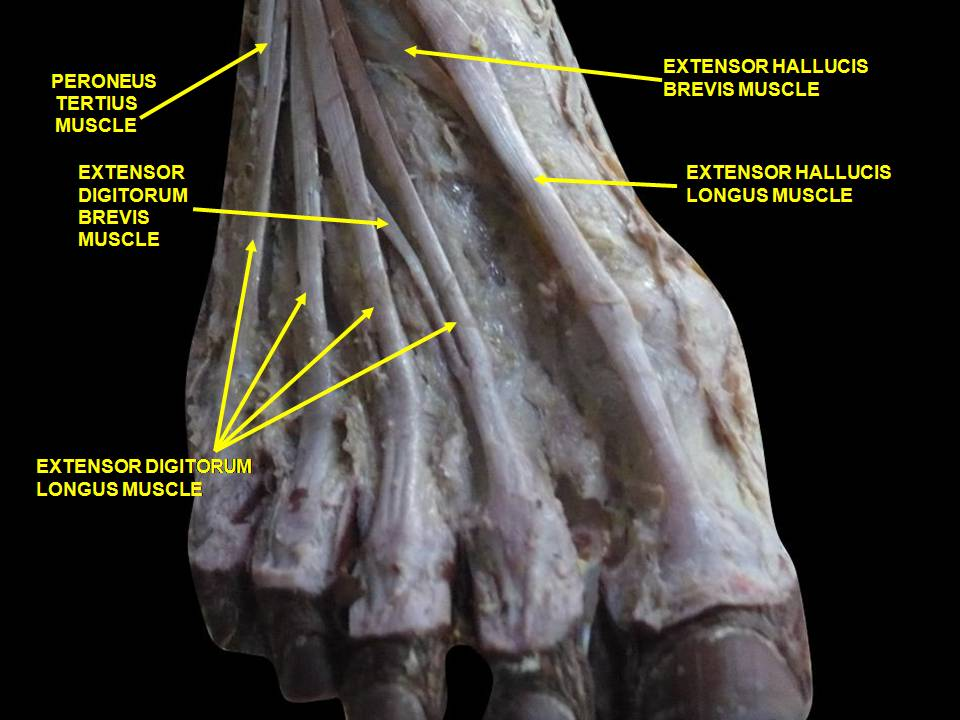
Dorsum of foot. Deep dissection.

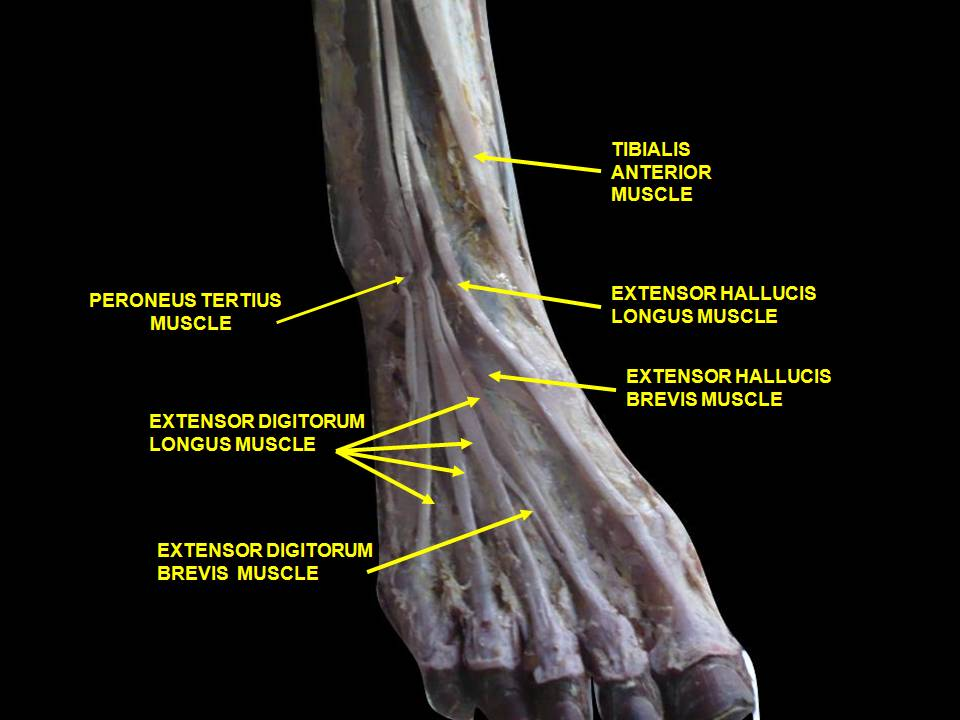
Dorsum of foot. Deep dissection.

== See also ==
- Extensor digitorum longus muscle
- Extensor hallucis brevis
- Extensor digitorum muscle
