= Extensor hallucis brevis muscle =

Muscle on the top of the foot that helps to extend the big toe

Extensor hallucis brevis
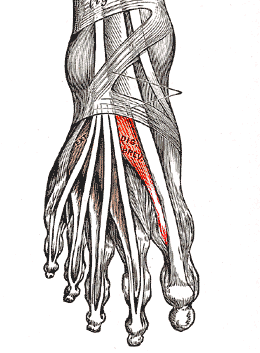
- Muscles of the front of the leg. (Ext. hallucis brevis colored in red.)

- Animation

Details
- Origin: Calcaneus
- Insertion: Proximal phalanx of digit 1 (hallux, or the great toe)
- Artery: Dorsalis pedis artery
- Nerve: Deep fibular nerve
- Actions: Extend hallux
- Antagonist: Flexor hallucis brevis muscle

Identifiers
- Latin: musculus extensor hallucis brevis
- TA98: A04.7.02.054
- TA2: 2670
- FMA: 51141

The extensor hallucis brevis is a muscle on the top of the foot that helps to extend the big toe.

== Structure ==
The extensor hallucis brevis is essentially the medial part of the extensor digitorum brevis muscle. Some anatomists have debated whether these two muscles are distinct entities.

The extensor hallucis brevis arises from the calcaneus and inserts on the proximal phalanx of the digit 1 (the big toe).

=== Nerve supply ===
Nerve supplied by lateral terminal branch of the deep peroneal nerve (deep fibular nerve) (proximal sciatic branches S1, S2). Same innervation of extensor digitorum brevis.

== Function ==
The extensor hallucis brevis helps to extend the big toe.

== See also ==
- Extensor digitorum brevis
- Extensor hallucis longus

== Additional images ==
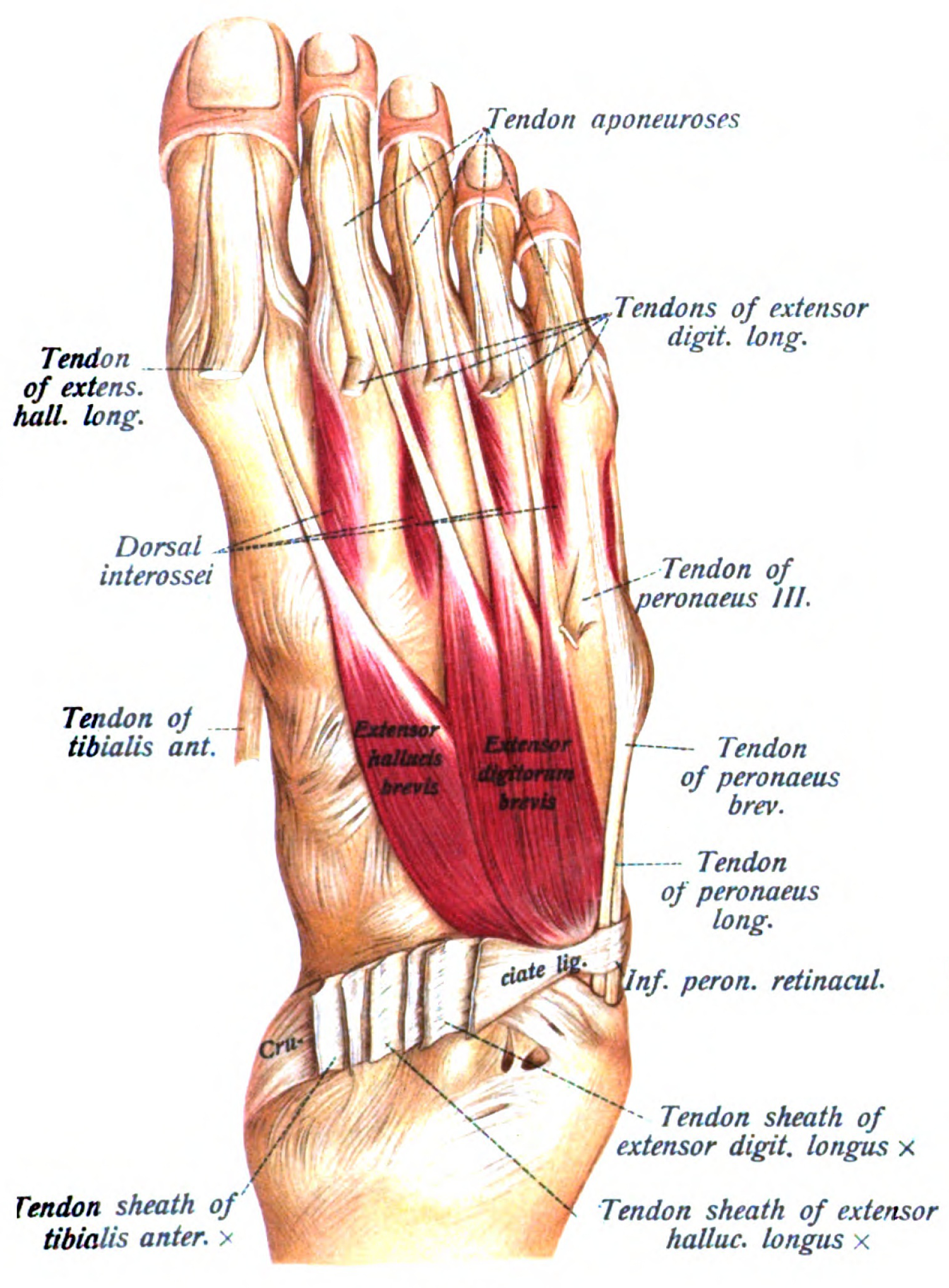
Ext. hallucis brevis labeled at center.

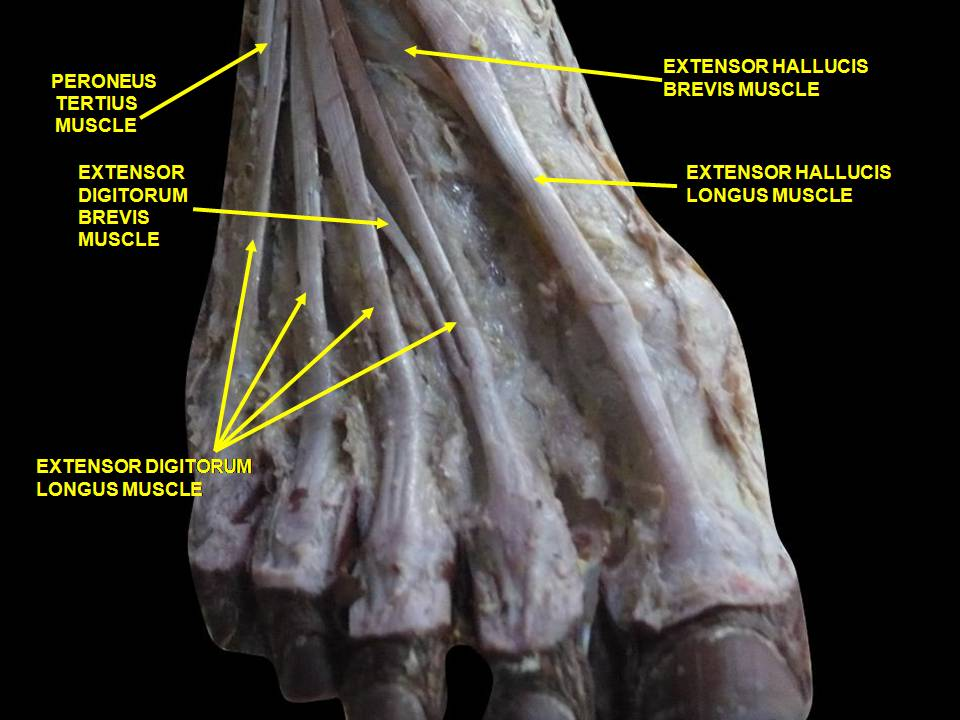
Dorsum of foot. Deep dissection.

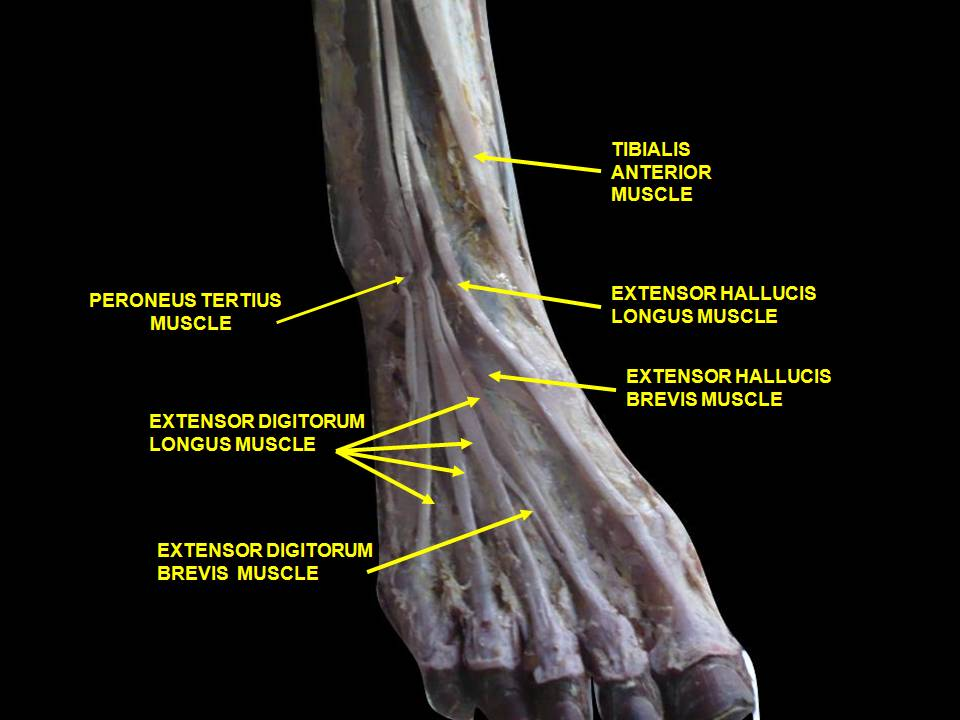
Dorsum of foot. Deep dissection.
