= Anterior compartment of leg =

Part of the fascial compartments of leg

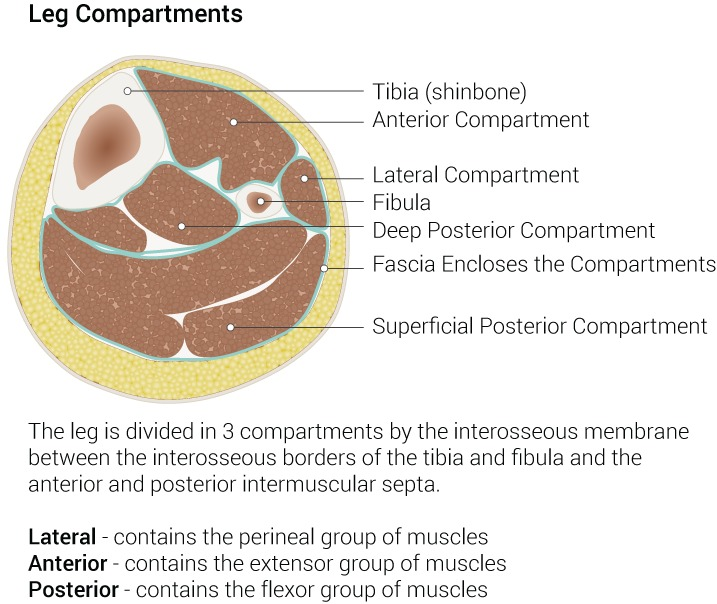
- Cross-section through middle of leg. Anterior compartment is shown right to the tibia.
- Dissection video (2 min 44 s)

Details
- Artery: anterior tibial artery
- Nerve: deep fibular nerve

Identifiers
- Latin: compartimentum cruris anterius
- TA98: A04.7.01.005
- TA2: 2643
- FMA: 45163

The anterior compartment of the leg is a fascial compartment of the lower leg. It contains muscles that produce dorsiflexion and participate in inversion and eversion of the foot, as well as vascular and nervous elements, including the anterior tibial artery and veins and the deep fibular nerve.

== Muscles ==
The muscles of the compartment are:

- tibialis anterior
- extensor hallucis longus
- extensor digitorum longus
- fibularis (peroneus) tertius

Image	Muscle	Origin	Insertion	Innervation	Main Action
	Tibialis anterior	Lateral condyle and superior half of lateral surface of tibia and interosseous membrane	Medial and inferior surfaces of medial cuneiform and base of 1st metatarsal	Deep fibular (peroneal) nerve (L4, L5)	Dorsiflexes ankle and inverts foot
	Extensor hallucis longus	Middle part of anterior surface of fibula and interosseous membrane	Dorsal aspect of base of distal phalanx of great toe (hallux)	Deep fibular (peroneal) nerve (L4, L5)	Extends great toe and dorsiflexes ankle
	Extensor digitorum longus	Lateral condyle of tibia and superior three quarters of medial surface of fibula and interosseous membrane	Middle and distal phalanges of lateral four digits	Deep fibular (peroneal) nerve (L4, L5)	Extends lateral four digits and dorsiflexes ankle
	Fibularis tertius	Inferior third of anterior surface of fibula and interosseous membrane	Dorsum of base of 5th metatarsal	Deep fibular (peroneal) nerve (L4, L5)	Dorsiflexes ankle and aids in eversion of foot

== Function ==
The compartment contains muscles that are dorsiflexors and participate in inversion and eversion of the foot.

== Innervation and blood supply ==
The anterior compartment of the leg is supplied by the deep fibular nerve (deep peroneal nerve), a branch of the common fibular nerve. The nerve contains axons from the L4, L5, and S1 spinal nerves.

Blood for the compartment is supplied by the anterior tibial artery, which runs between the tibialis anterior and extensor digitorum longus muscles. When the artery crosses the extensor retinaculum, it changes its name to dorsalis pedis artery.

== Additional images ==
Anterior compartment. Animation.

== See also ==
- Fascial compartments of leg
- Crural fascia
