= Dorsal digital nerves of foot =

Various nerve branches that supply the toes

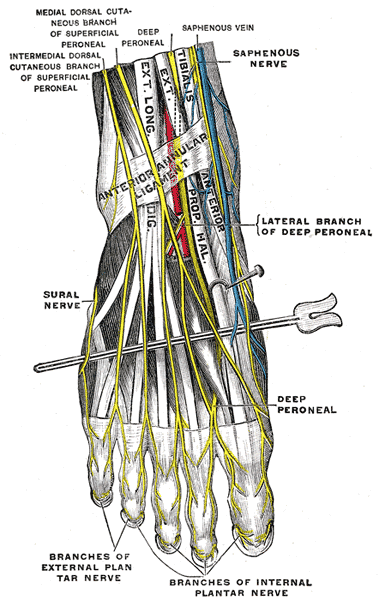
- Nerves of the dorsum of the foot.

Details

Identifiers
- Latin: nervi digitales dorsales pedis
- TA98: A14.2.07.054; A14.2.07.057
- TA2: 6578, 6581
- FMA: 75491

Dorsal digital nerves of foot are branches of the intermediate dorsal cutaneous nerve, medial dorsal cutaneous nerve, sural nerve and deep fibular nerve.

== Structures ==
There are 10 total dorsal digital branches:

- The medial terminal branch (internal branch) divides into two dorsal digital nerves (nn. digitales dorsales hallucis lateralis et digiti secundi medialis) which supply the adjacent sides of the great and second toes,
- The medial dorsal cutaneous nerve (internal dorsal cutaneous branch) passes in front of the ankle-joint, and divides into three dorsal digital branches, one of which supplies the medial side of the great toe, the other, the adjacent sides of the second and third toes.
- The intermediate dorsal cutaneous nerve divides into four dorsal digital branches, which supply the medial and lateral sides of the third and fourth, and of the fourth and fifth toes.
- The lateral dorsal cutaneous nerve from the sural nerve turns into a dorsal digital nerve and supplies the lateral side of the fifth toe.

== Clinical significance ==
The dorsal digital nerves of the foot may be compressed by the transverse metatarsal ligament. This causes Morton's neuroma, which causes foot pain.

== Additional Image ==
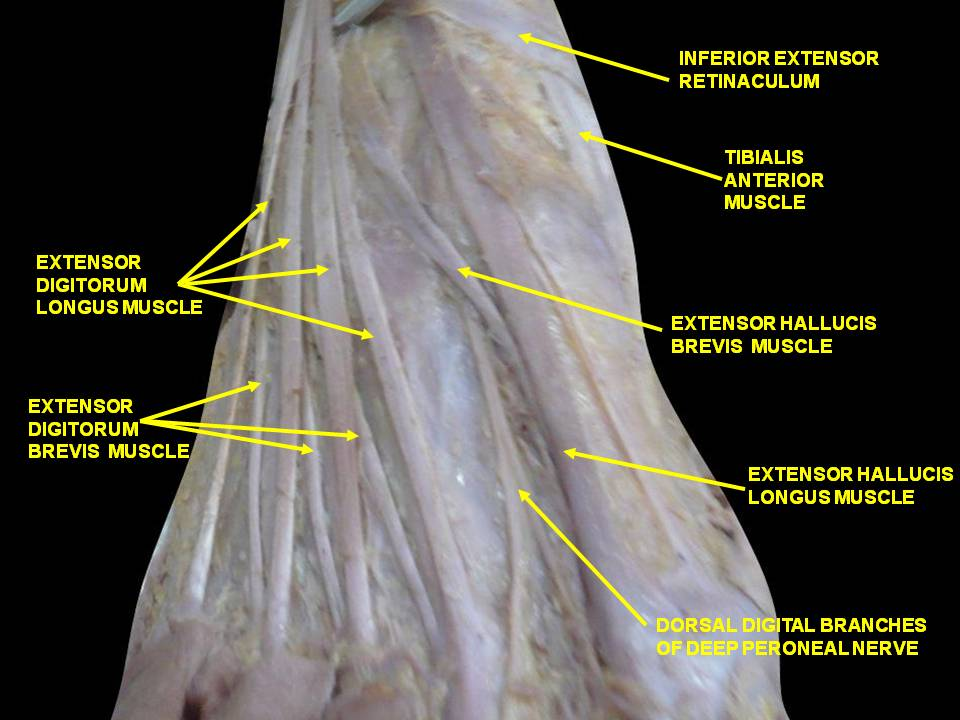
Dorsal digital nerves of foot.Deep dissection.

== See also ==
- Common plantar digital nerves of medial plantar nerve
