= Intermediate dorsal cutaneous nerve =

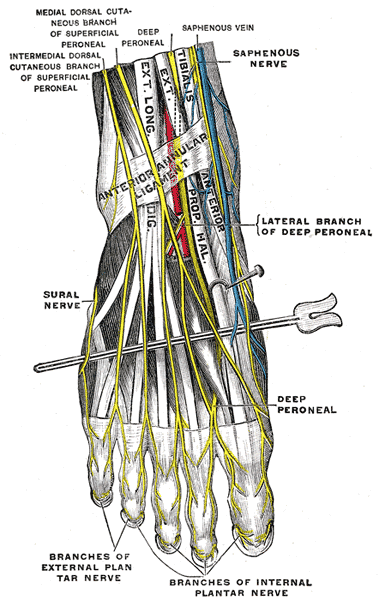
- Nerves of the dorsum of the foot. (Intermediate dorsal cutaneous labeled at upper left.)

Details
- From: superficial fibular nerve

Identifiers
- Latin: nervus cutaneus dorsalis intermedius
- TA98: A14.2.07.053
- TA2: 6577
- FMA: 44810

The intermediate dorsal cutaneous nerve (external dorsal cutaneous branch) is the smaller and more lateral one of the two terminal branches of the superficial fibular nerve (the other being the medial dorsal cutaneous nerve). It passes over the third intermetatarsal space before itself bifurcating into two terminal branches: the lateral dorsal digital nerve of the third toe, and the medial dorsal digital nerve of the fourth toe.

== Anatomy ==
=== Origin ===
The superficial fibular nerve terminates by bifurcating into the intermediate dorsal cutaneous nerve and the medial dorsal cutaneous nerve immediately after emerging from the deep fascia of leg at the distal two-thirds to three-fourths point of the leg.

=== Distribution ===
Through its two terminal branches, the intermediate dorsal cutaneous nerve provides sensory innervation to the contiguous dorsal aspects of the 3rd and 4th toes, and of the 4th and 5th toes.

It also provides innervation to the skin of the lateral side of the foot and ankle.

=== Anastomoses ===
It anastomoses with the sural nerve.

=== Variation ===
Frequently some of the lateral branches of the intermediate dorsal cutaneous nerves are replaced by branches of the lateral dorsal cutaneous nerve.
