= Deep fibular nerve =

Type of nerve

Deep fibular (peroneal) nerve
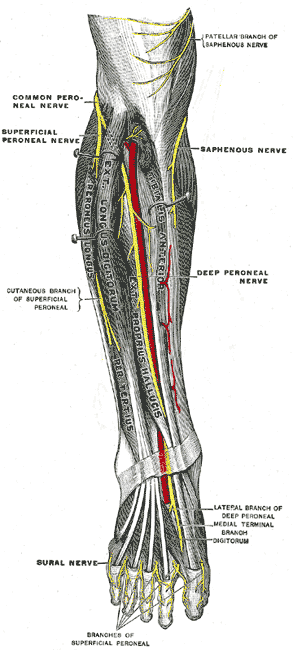
- Nerves of the right lower extremity, anterior view.

Details
- From: Common fibular nerve
- Innervates: Anterior compartment of leg

Identifiers
- Latin: nervus fibularis profundus, nervus peroneus profundus
- TA98: A14.2.07.055
- TA2: 6579
- FMA: 44771

The deep fibular nerve (also known as deep peroneal nerve) begins at the bifurcation of the common fibular nerve between the fibula and upper part of the fibularis longus, passes infero-medially, deep to the extensor digitorum longus, to the anterior surface of the interosseous membrane, and comes into relation with the anterior tibial artery above the middle of the leg; it then descends with the artery to the front of the ankle-joint, where it divides into a lateral and a medial terminal branch.

== Structure ==
=== Lateral side of the leg ===
The deep fibular nerve is the nerve of the anterior compartment of the leg and the dorsum of the foot. It is one of the terminal branches of the common fibular nerve. It corresponds to the posterior interosseus nerve of the forearm. It begins at the lateral side of the fibula bone, and then enters the anterior compartment by piercing the anterior intermuscular septum. It then pierces the extensor digitorum longus and lies next to the anterior tibial artery, following the course of the artery until the ankle-joint where the nerve divides into medial and lateral terminal branches. In the leg, the deep fibular nerve divides into several branches:

- Muscular branches: Supplies four muscles in the leg: tibialis anterior, extensor hallucis longus, extensor digitorum longus, and fibularis tertius

=== Foot ===
Close to the ankle joint, the deep fibular nerve terminates by dividing into medial and lateral terminal branches.

- Medial terminal branch: This nerve accompanies the dorsalis pedis artery along the dorsum of the foot, and, at the first interosseous space, divides into two dorsal digital nerves which supply the adjacent sides of the great and second toes, communicating with the medial dorsal cutaneous branch of the superficial fibular nerve. Before it divides it gives off to the first space an interosseous branch which supplies the metatarsophalangeal joint of the great toe and sends a filament to the first Interosseous dorsalis muscle.
- Lateral terminal branch - This nerve passes across the tarsus, beneath the extensor digitorum brevis, supplying latter. This nerve ends in a pseudoganglion deep to the extensor digitorum brevis. From the pseudoganglion, three minute branches are given off to supply the tarsal joints and the metatarsophalangeal joints of the second, third, and fourth toes.

== Function ==
In the leg, the deep fibular nerve supplies muscular branches to the anterior compartment of extensor muscles in the leg which include the tibialis anterior, extensor digitorum longus, fibularis tertius, and extensor hallucis longus (propius), and an articular branch to the ankle-joint. After its bifurcation past the ankle joint, the lateral branch of the deep fibular nerve innervates the extensor digitorum brevis and the extensor hallucis brevis, while the medial branch goes on to provide cutaneous innervation to the webbing between the first and second toes.

== Clinical significance ==
Damage to the deep fibular nerve, as is possible with traumatic injury to the lateral knee, results in foot drop. The deep fibular nerve is also subject to injury resulting from lower motor neuron disease, diabetes, ischemia, and infectious or inflammatory conditions. Injury to the common fibular nerve is the most common isolated mononeuropathy of the lower extremity and produces sensory problems on the lateral lower leg in addition to foot drop.

== Additional images ==
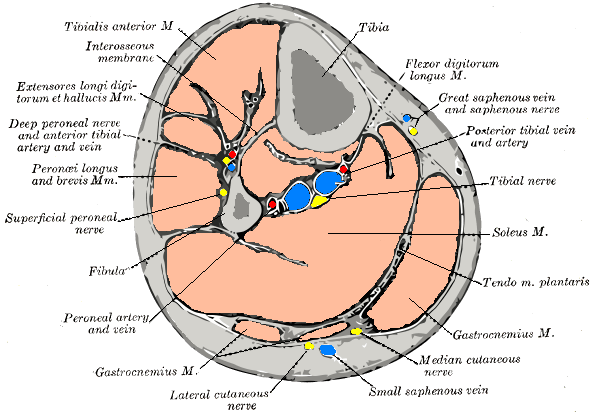
Cross-section through middle of leg.

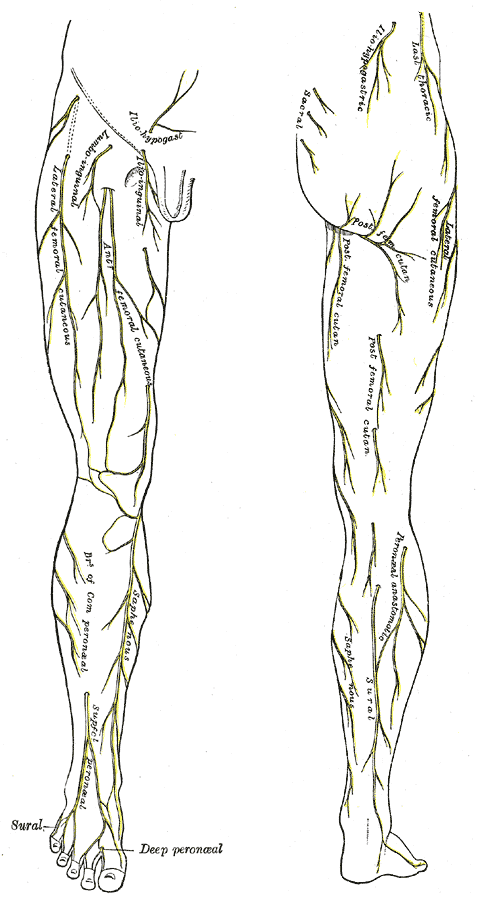
Cutaneous nerves of the right lower extremity, anterior and posterior views.

Cutaneous nerves of the right lower extremity, anterior and posterior views.

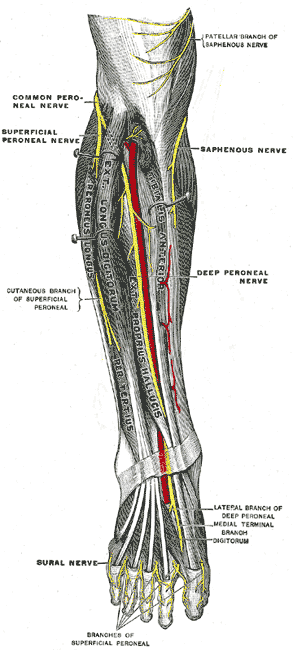
Deep nerves of the front of the leg.

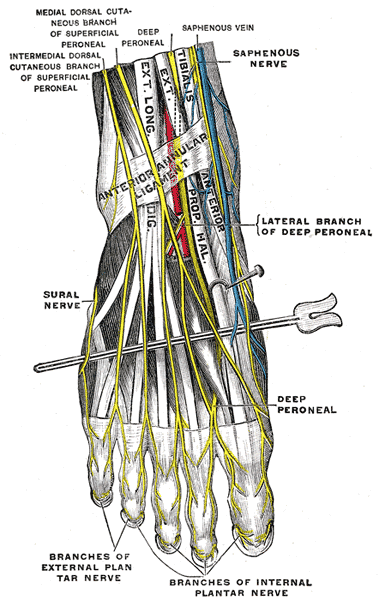
Nerves of the dorsum of the foot.

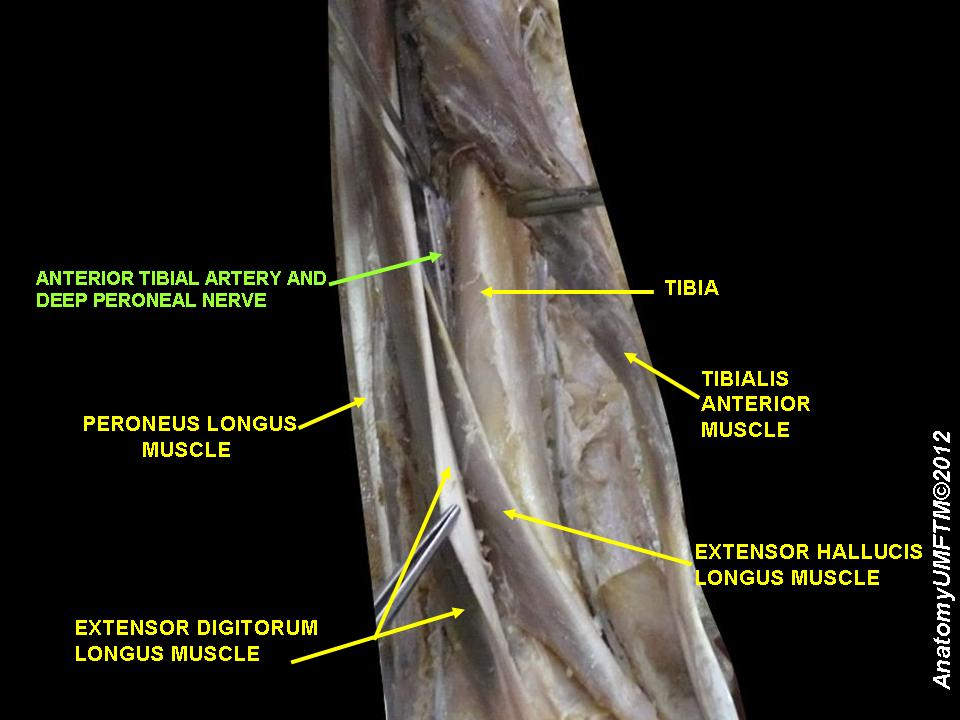
Deep fibular nerve
