= Posterior intermuscular septum of leg =

Band of fascia which separates the lateral compartment of leg

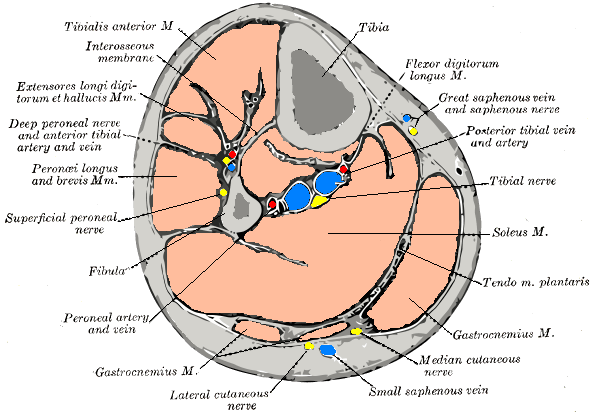
- Cross-section through middle of leg.

Details

Identifiers
- Latin: septum intermusculare cruris posterius
- TA98: A04.7.03.023
- TA2: 2710
- FMA: 58758

The posterior intermuscular septum of leg or posterior crural intermuscular septum is a band of fascia which separates the lateral compartment of leg.

The deep fascia of leg gives off from its deep surface, on the lateral side of the leg, two strong intermuscular septa, the anterior and posterior peroneal septa, which enclose the peronæi longus and brevis, and separate them from the muscles of the anterior and posterior crural regions, and several more slender processes which enclose the individual muscles in each region.
