= Sural cutaneous nerve =

Sural cutaneous nerve may refer to:

- Lateral sural cutaneous nerve
- Medial sural cutaneous nerve
