= Sural nerve complex =

The sural nerve complex are the contributing nerves that form the sural nerve. There are eight documented anatomic variations of the sural nerve complex.

== Origins ==
In 1987, an orthopedic surgeon named Dr. Ortiguela of the Mayo Clinic conducted a cadaveric study in which the posterior leg was exposed. She was studying the nerve fascicle contribution of each of the nerves that contribute to the final formation of the sural nerve to find better nerve donors. She originated the term sural nerve complex to fully encompass all contributions to the terminally named sural nerve (and later lateral dorsal cutaneous nerve). Further research would go on to use the sural nerve complex terminology to discuss the lateral sural cutaneous nerve, the medial sural cutaneous nerve, the sural communicating nerve and sural nerve proper.

=== Morphology ===
Recent cadaveric research shows that there are potentially six to eight variations of the sural nerve complex.

Ramakrishnan et al. reviewed 39 cadaveric studies (limbs n= 3974) and concluded that there were 6 common classifications of the contributing nerves in the origins of the sural nerve. Later cadaveric research in which 208 limbs were dissected demonstrated two variations that were unaccounted for and directly align with what previous sural nerve anatomists had uncovered in both case reports and direct research. These two variations (type 7 and 8 according to Steele et al.) demonstrate a parallel course for the medial sural cutaneous nerve and the sural nerve.

Most common formations are type 1 and 3 according to Ramakrishnan et al., Steele et al. found the same prevalence of sural nerve complex formation. The following image is of type 1-8 sural nerve formation and is a replica of what both Ramakrishan and Steele found in their work. Ramakrishnan successfully defined (types 1-6) with the largest difference being the addition of type 7 and 8 sural nerve complex by Steele. These two formations were robustly vetted due to their prevalence in the sample (in a high power study) that directly correlates with both historical and previous case literature describing formations of these SNC types.

=== Contributing Nerves ===
- Lateral sural cutaneous nerve
- Medial sural cutaneous nerve
- Sural communicating nerve

Sural Nerve complex
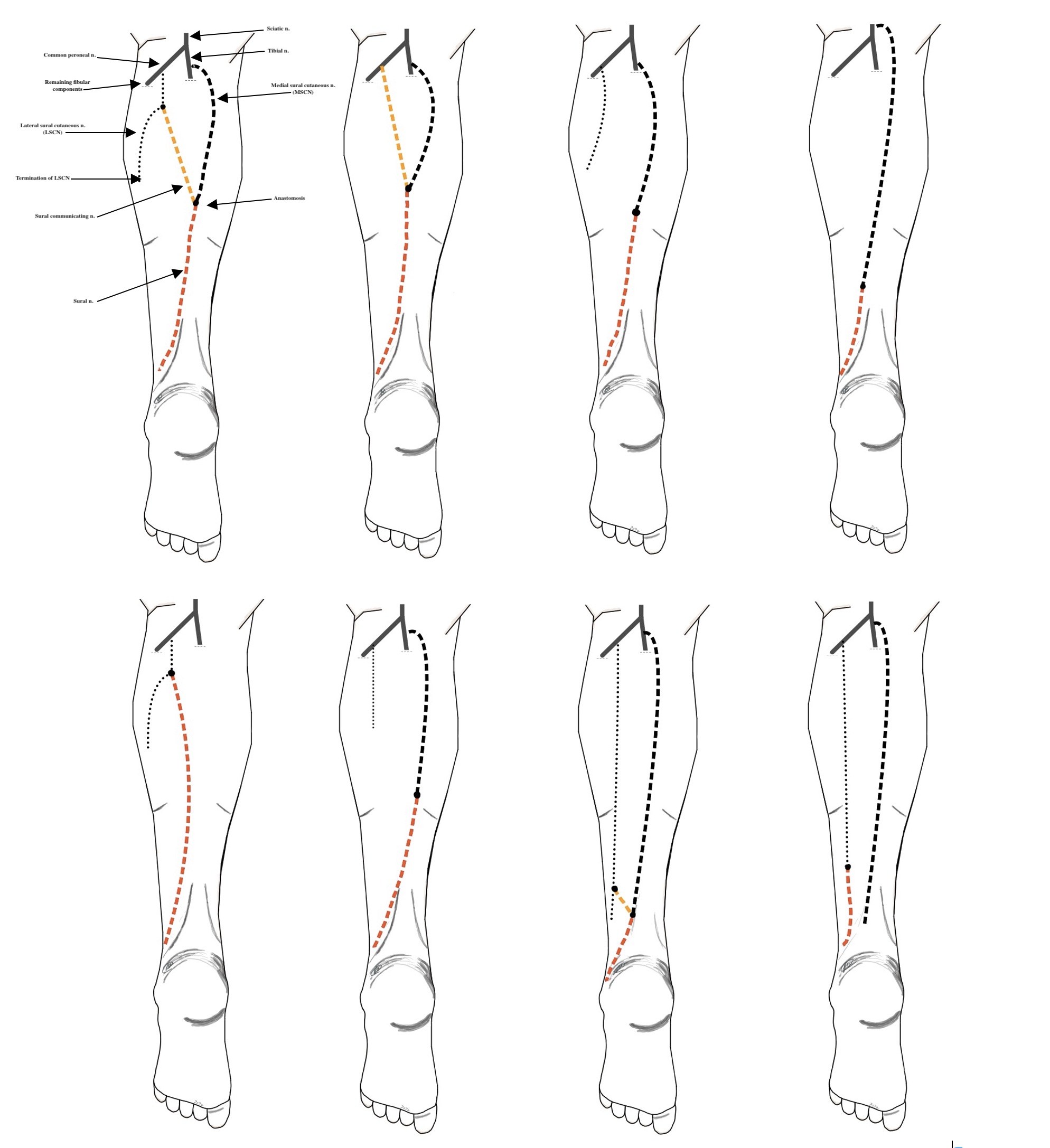
- Sural nerve complex consists of the lateral sural cutaneous nerve (small black dash), media sural cutaneous nerve (large black dash), sural communicating branch/neve (large yellow dash). These together contribute eight variations in which the sural nerve may form.

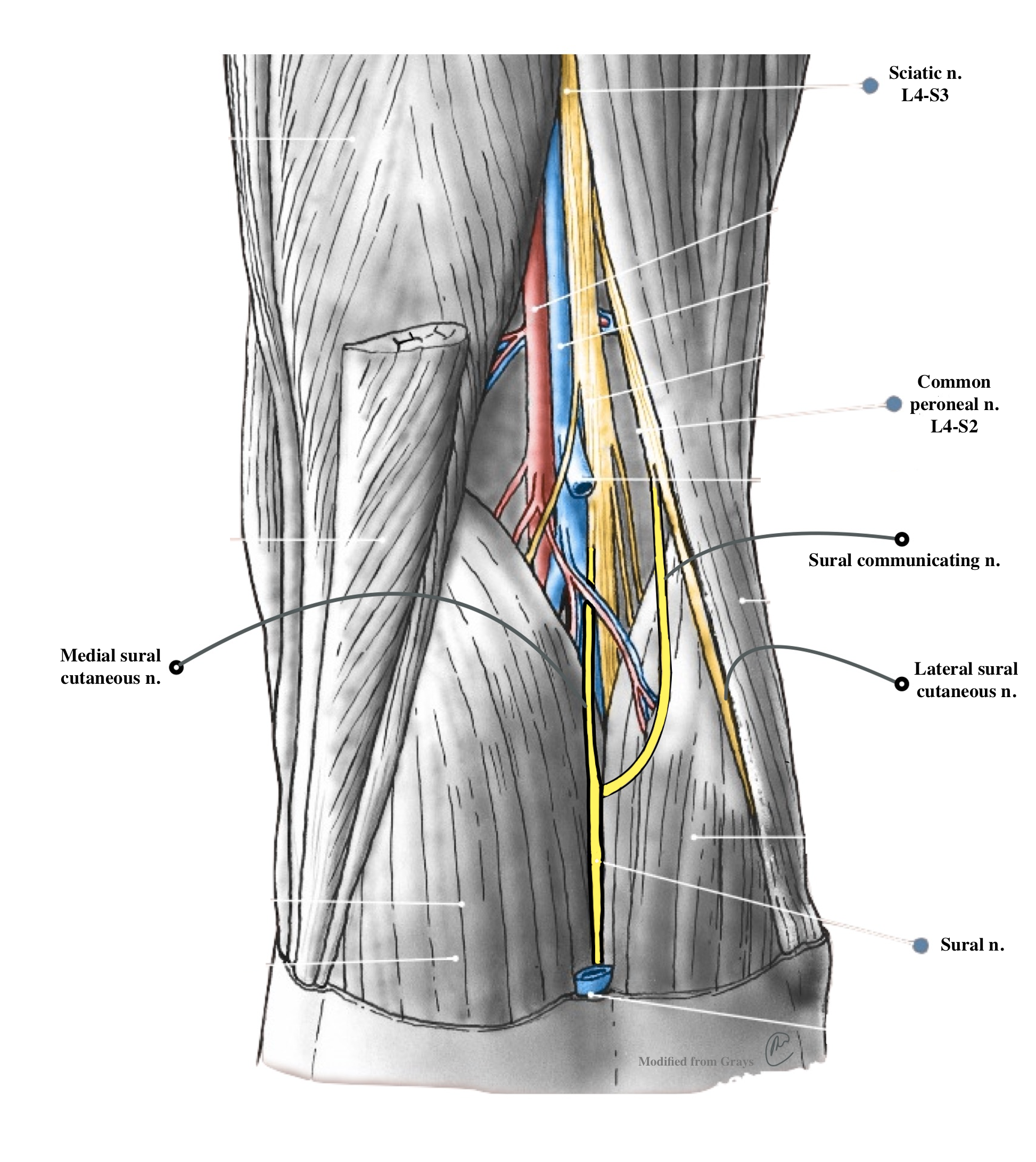
- Cartoon version adapted from Steele et al. depicting type 1 sural nerve with contribution of medial sural cutaneous nerve and sural communicating branch

== Additional images ==
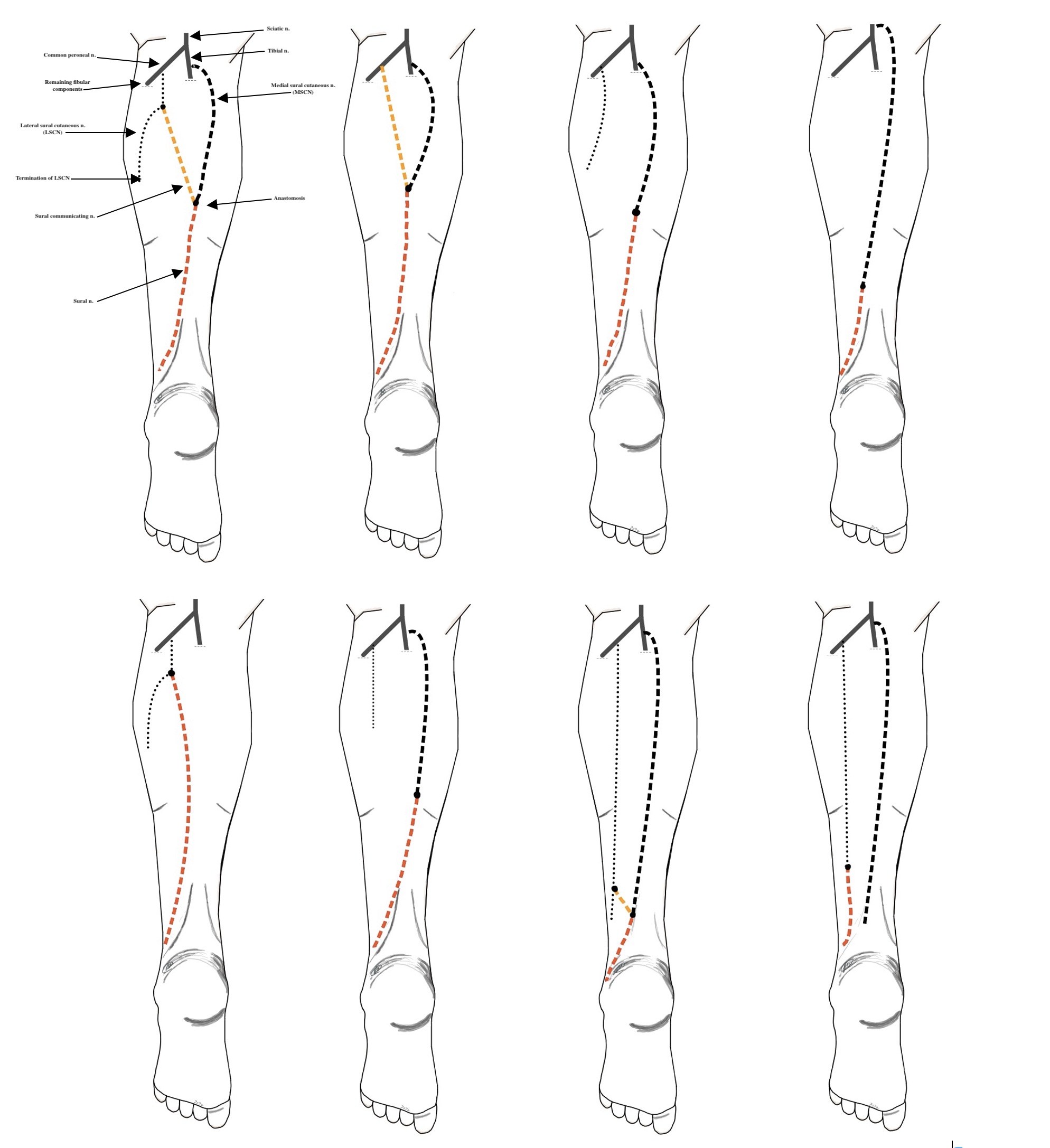
8 documented types of sural nerve formation, nerves are in order by type starting at top left and ending on bottom right.

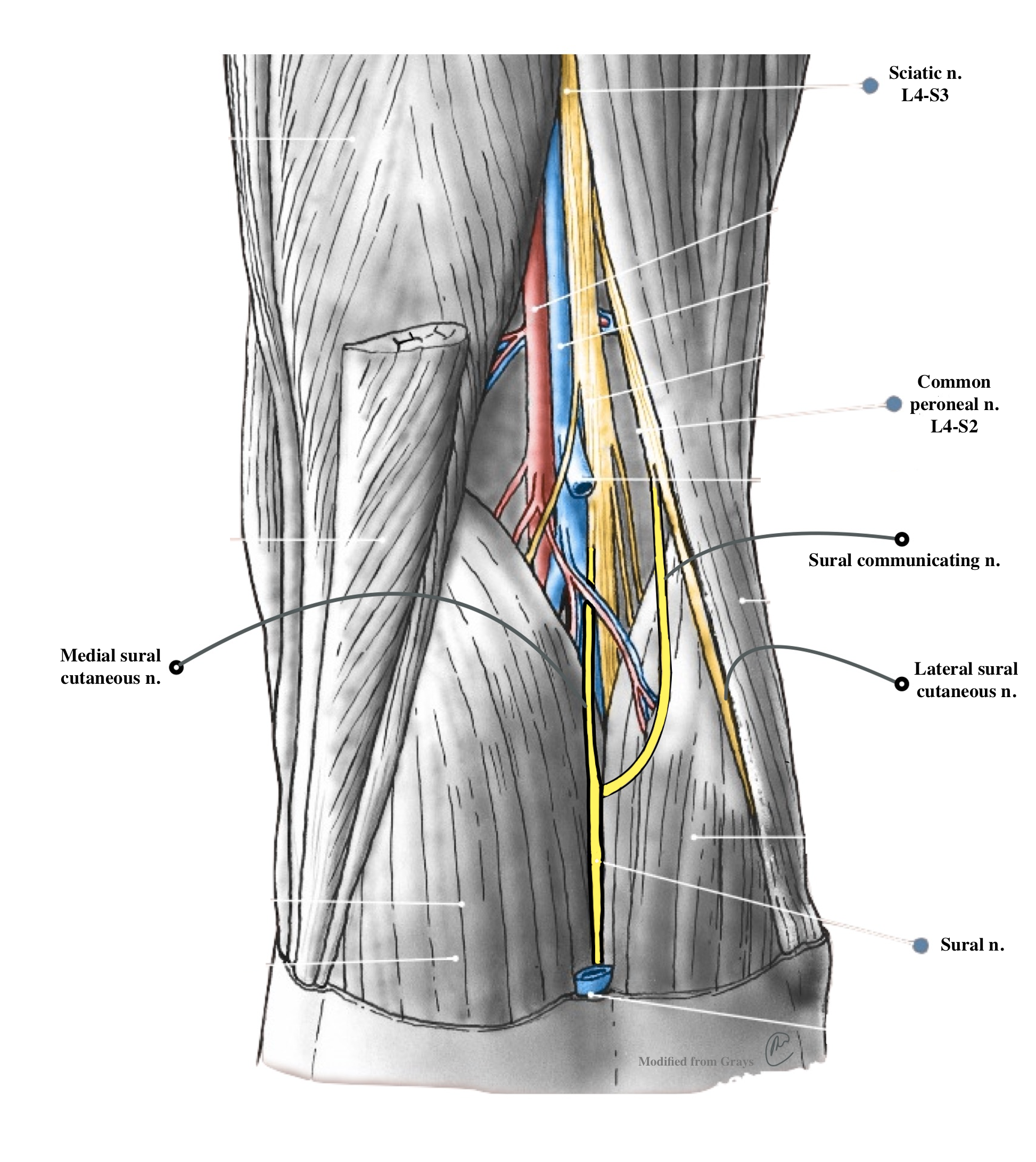
Most common formation (type 1) of the sural nerve depicted in the popliteal fossa

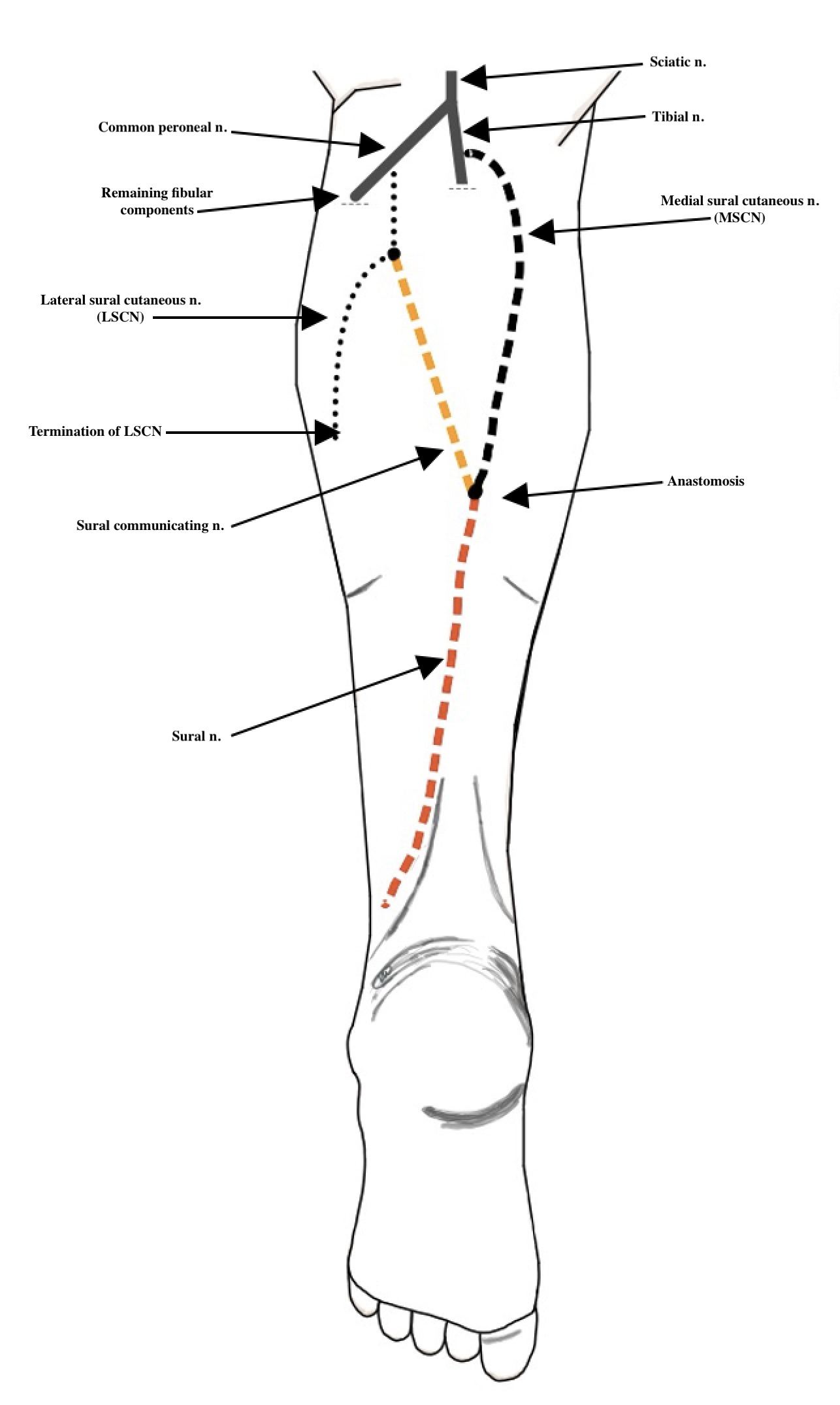
Most common formation of the sural nerve by Steele et al.

Areas of skin sensation supplied by nerves in the leg.

Areas of skin supplied by nerves of the leg - the sural nerve supplies the lateral ankle.

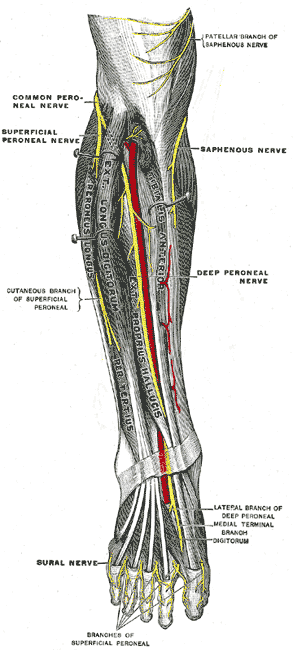
Deep nerves of the front of the leg.

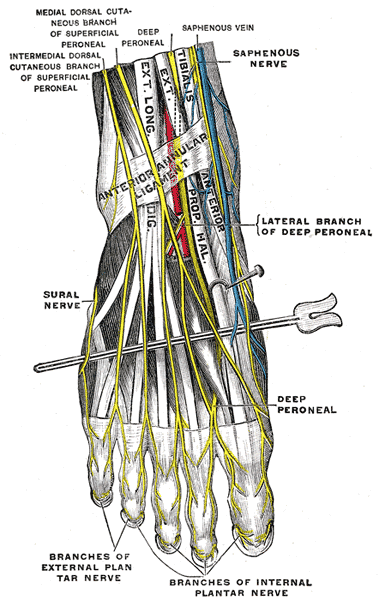
Course of nerves at the bottom of the foot.
