= Sural communicating branch of common peroneal nerve =

Communicating nerve transferring nerve fascicles to the medial sural cutaneous nerve

Sural communicating nerve
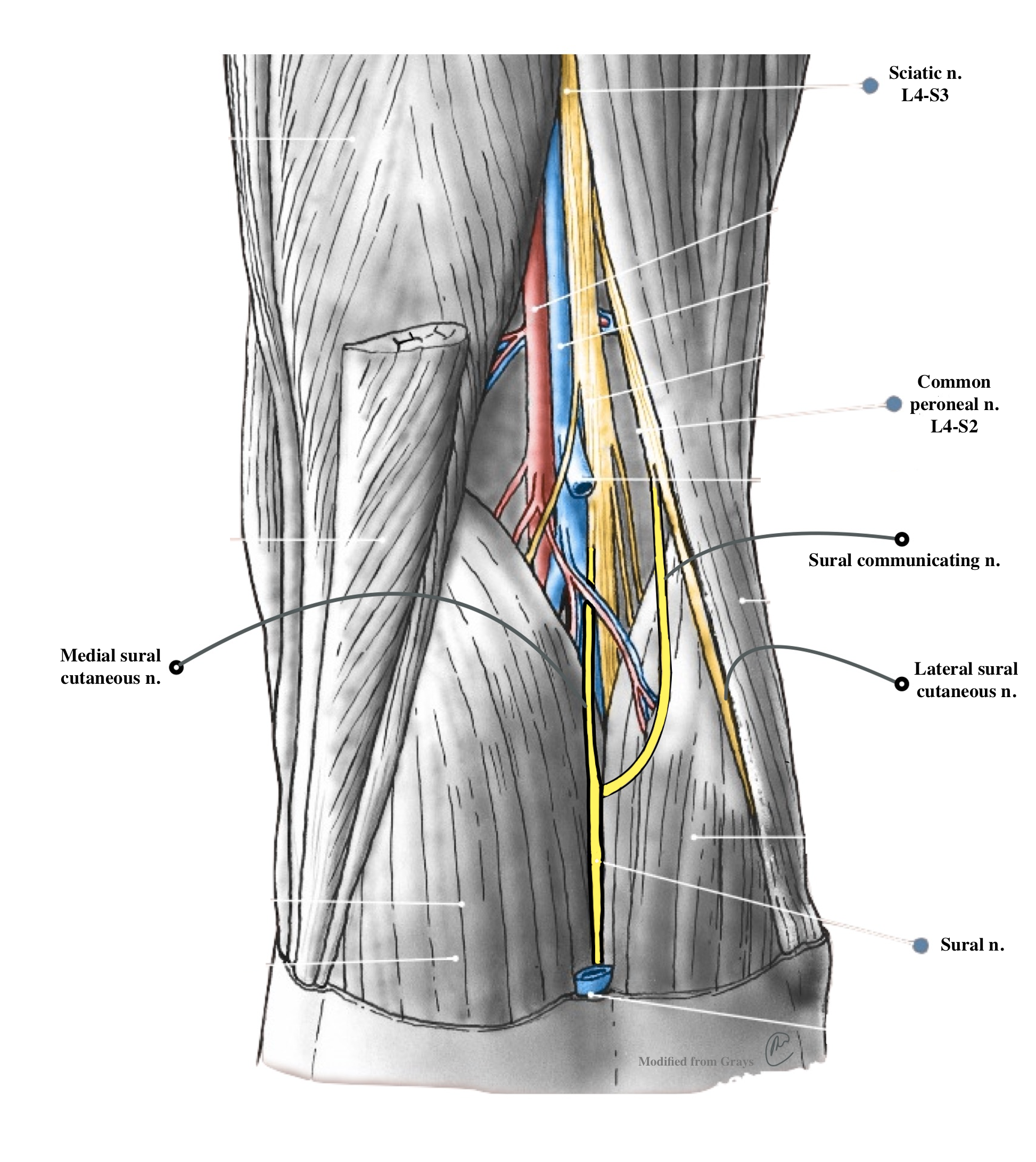
- Dissection of popliteal space to show the formation of a type 1 sural nerve

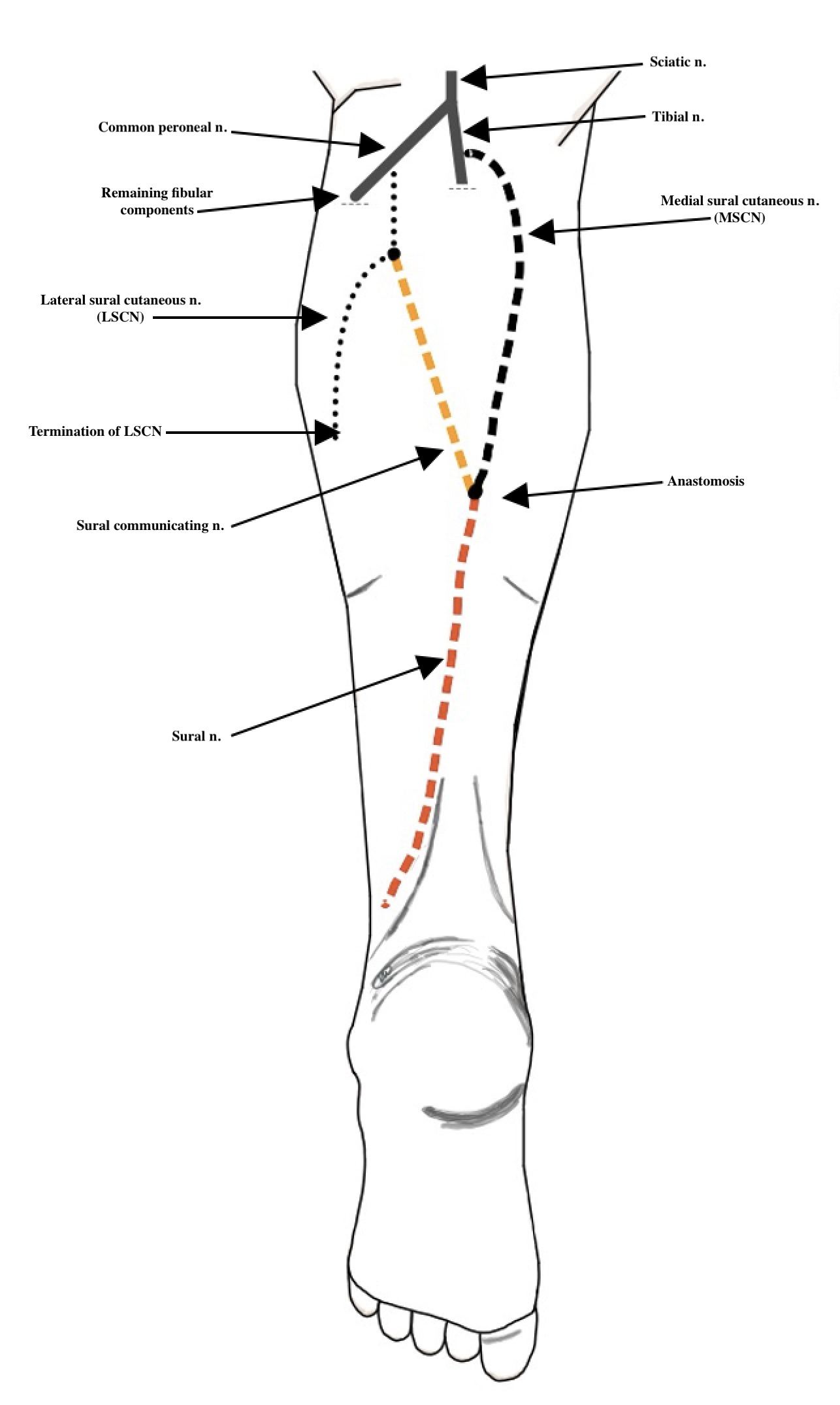
- Cartoon version adapted from Steele et al. depicting type 1 sural nerve

Details
- From: Lateral sural cutaneous nerve
- To: Medial sural cutaneous nerve

Identifiers
- Latin: r. communicans fibularis
- TA98: A14.2.07.049
- TA2: 6573
- FMA: 77602

The sural communicating nerve (SCN) (peroneal communicating branch of the common fibular nerve) is a separate and independent nerve from both the medial and lateral sural cutaneous nerves, often arising from a common trunk of the common fibular nerve The primary purpose of the sural communicating branch is to provide the structural path for transferring tibial nerve fascicular components to the sural nerve.

== Anatomy ==
The sural communicating nerve (colloquially the peroneal communicating nerve) is one of the components of the sural nerve complex (MSCN, LSCN, SCN). It travels in an inferomedial direction from its origins either as a terminal component of the LSCN or is considered a nerve that originates along a common trunk of the lateral sural cutaneous nerve.

This particular nerve is best described by Dr. Huelke in 1958. Dr. Huelke took the original modern cadaveric studies (from the turn of the 20th century) and wrote a treatise titled "The origin of the peroneal communicating nerve" that describes the origins and pathways of the peroneal communicating nerve. He did this research in such a way that would today be called a systematic review with the addition of his own cadaveric samples. He reported that the peroneal communicating nerve was only considered named if it 'originated from the lateral sural cutaneous nerve to anastomose with the medial sural cutaneous nerve' to form the sural nerve proper.

Huelke found of the 159 samples that the peroneal communicating nerve arose from the common peroneal nerve with the lateral sural cutaneous nerve around 58.5% of the time and originated separately from the common peroneal nerve the remaining 41.5% of the time. In fact, Huelkes work is directly observed and fortified in a recent cadaveric study by Steele et al. in which further origins of the sural communicating nerve arise lending the name nerve over branch, however even now there is no firm definition of the communication from the common peroneal nerve or from the lateral sural cutaneous nerve. Steele et al. found that the sural communicating branch originated from the common peroneal nerve 50.79%, common trunk 16.67%, the lateral sural cutaneous nerve 30.16%, and sciatic nerve 2.38% of the 126 total samples that contained a sural communicating branch.

=== Essential component to the Sural Nerve Complex ===
The sural nerve complex was first used by Mayo Clinic orthopedic surgeon Dr. Ortiguela in a 1987 cadaveric study of the contributing nerves that is the genesis before the sural nerve moves from deep fascia of the gastrocnemius into the subcutaneous of the posterior sura. Later, meta-analysis and follow on large sample cadaveric confirmation study make reference to the sural communicating branch and both reference this nerve complex as the components contributing to the formation of the sural nerve.

In Steele et al. study identifying eight variations of the sural nerve formation. Types 1 and 7 sural nerve complex formations possess a sural communicating branch. This recent cadaveric study a 50.79% prevalence of nerves with a sural communicating nerve. Ramakrishnan et al. found that type 1 nerves (only sural nerve complex types that contain SCN as defined by his figures) were globally present in 51.50% of all cadaveric studies captured in their systematic review.

== Additional images ==
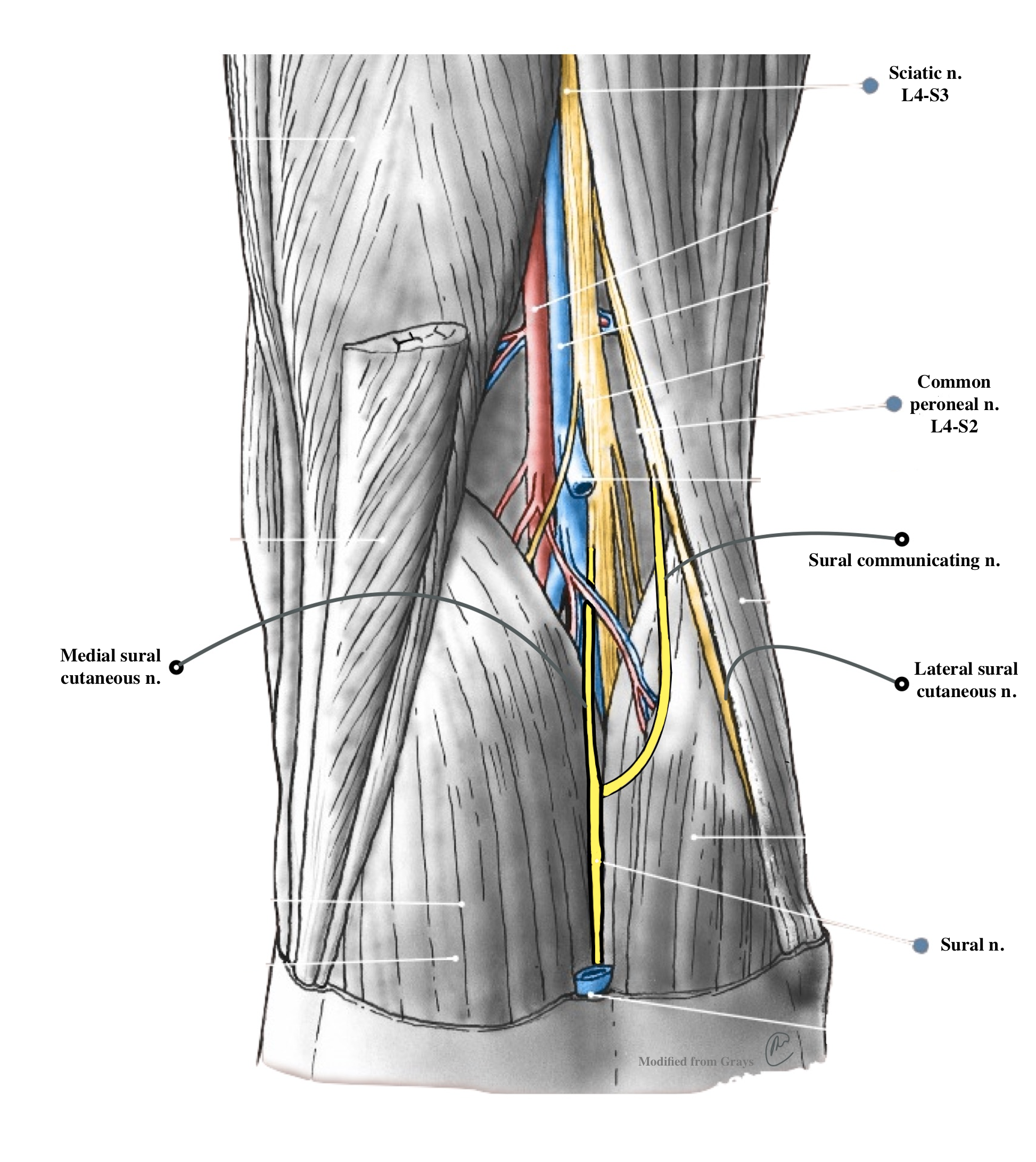
Most common formation (type 1) of the sural nerve depicted in the popliteal fossa

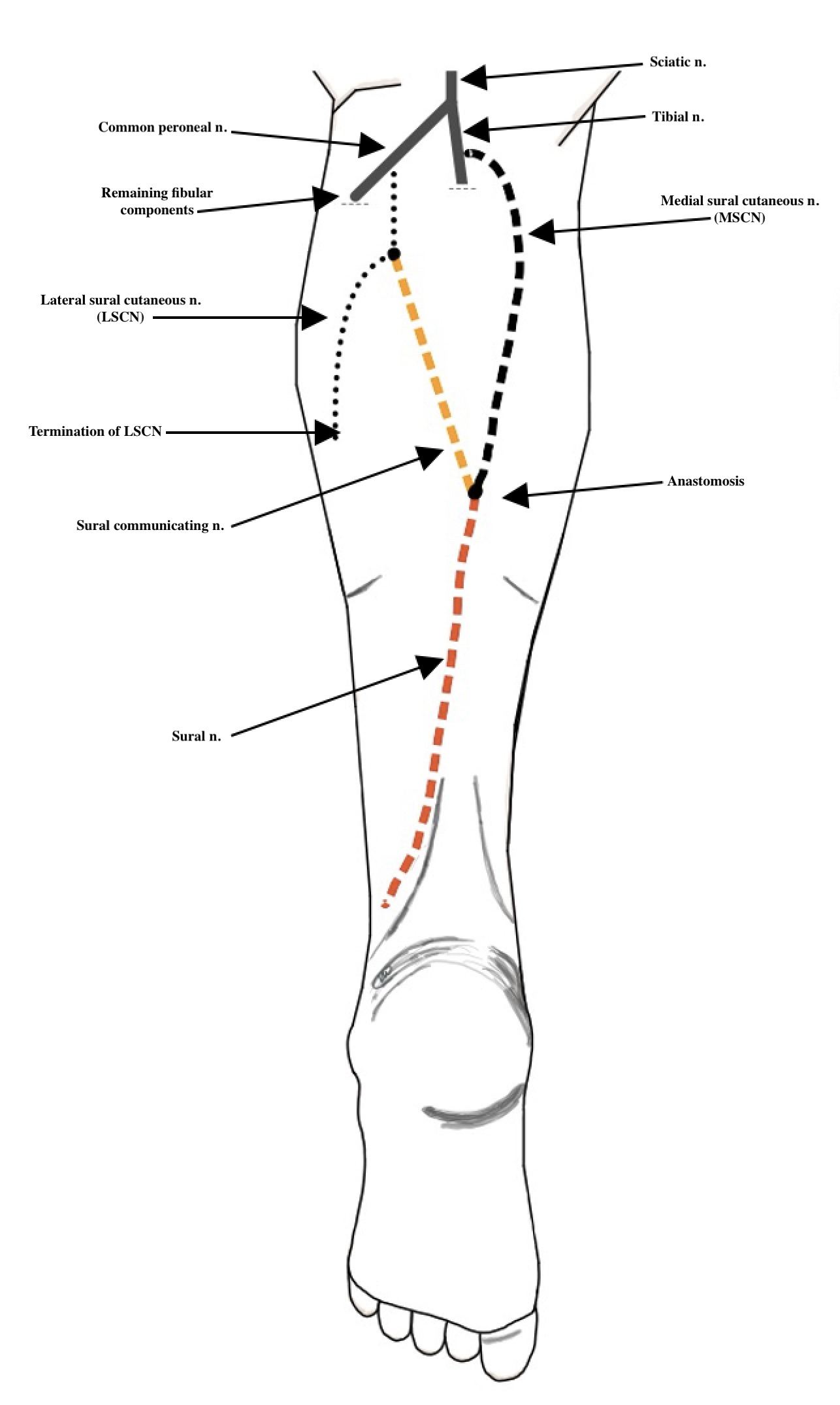
Most common formation of the sural nerve by Steele et al.

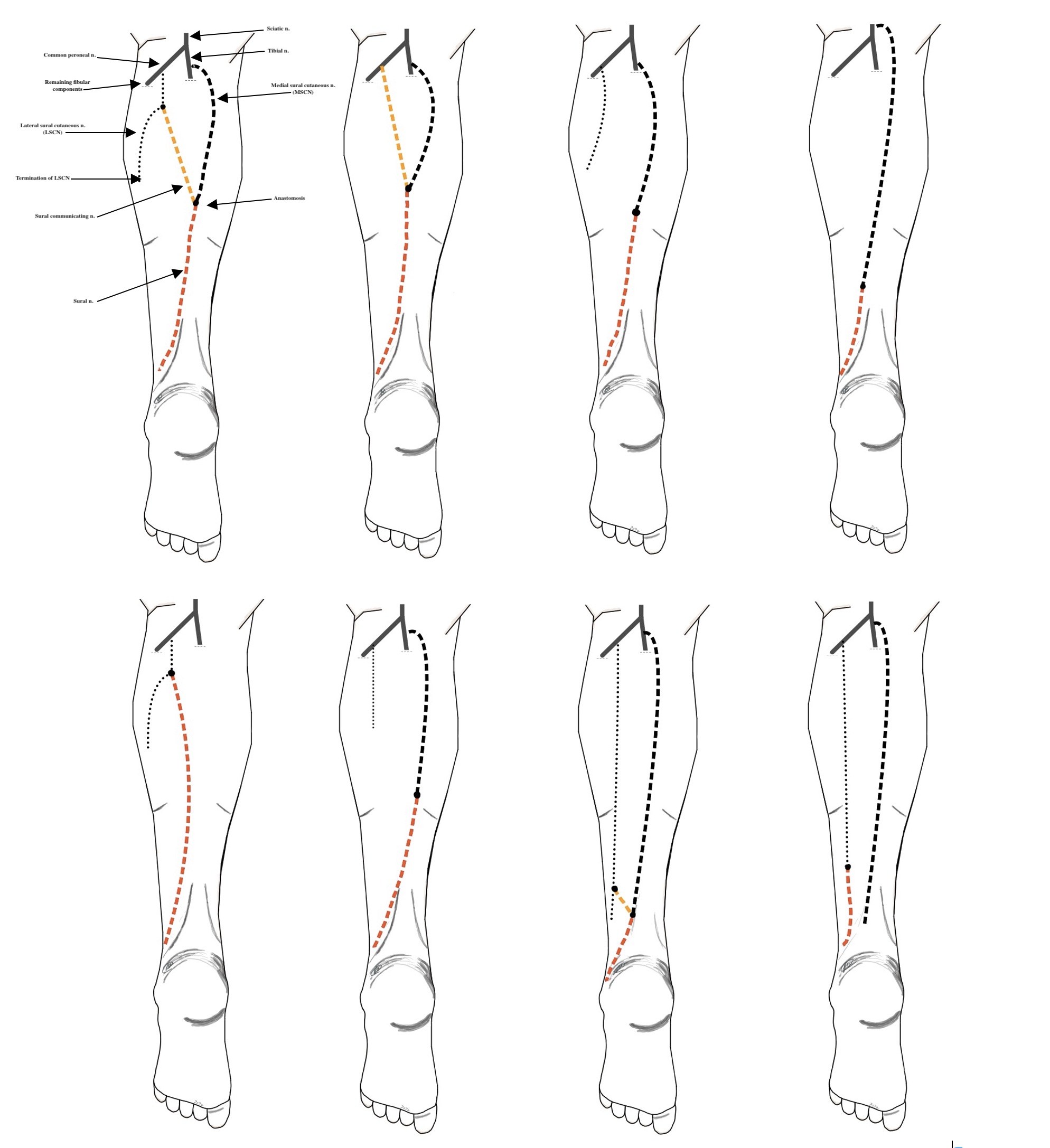
8 documented types of sural nerve formation

Areas of skin sensation supplied by nerves in the leg.

Areas of skin supplied by nerves of the leg - the sural nerve supplies the lateral ankle.

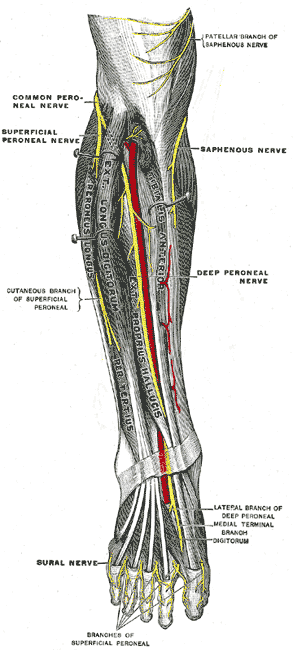
Deep nerves of the front of the leg.

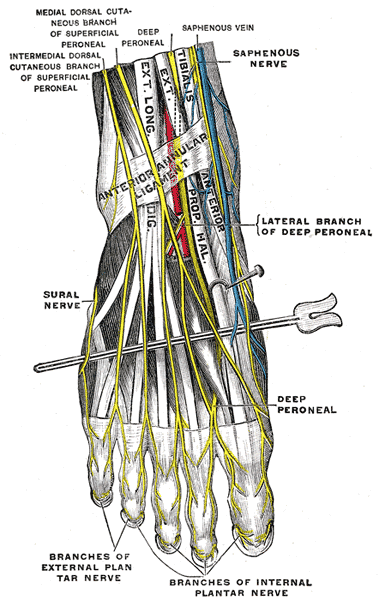
Course of nerves at the bottom of the foot.
