= Calcaneal branches =

Calcaneal branches may refer to:

- Lateral calcaneal branches of sural nerve
- Medial calcaneal branches of the tibial nerve
