= Calcaneal nerve branches =

The calcaneal nerve branches refer to:

- Medial calcaneal branches of the tibial nerve
- Lateral calcaneal branches of sural nerve
