= Nerve allograft =

Nerve allotransplantation (allo- means "other" in Greek) is the transplantation of a nerve to a receiver from a donor of the same species. For example, nerve tissue is transplanted from one person to another. Allotransplantation is a commonly used type of transplantation of which nerve repair is one specific aspect.

The transplant is called an allograft, allogeneic transplant, or homograft.

== Nerve allograft ==
A nerve allograft is used for the reconstruction of peripheral nerve discontinuities in order to support the axonal regeneration across a nerve gap caused by any injury. It is human nerve tissue, processed to remove cellular and noncellular factors such as cells, fat, blood, axonal debris and chondroitin sulfate proteoglycans while preserving the three-dimensional scaffold and basal lamina tubular structure of the nerve. This means the nerve allograft only consists of extracellular matrix (ECM), which is sterile and decullularized.

There are three types of nerves;

- Sensory nerves – carry sensory information from peripheral organs (e.g. skin) to the central nervous system. They are responsible for sensation and proprioception.
- Motor nerves – carry information from the central nervous system to peripheral organs (e.g. muscles). Nerve signal activity modulates muscle contraction, thereby enabling movement.
- Mixed nerves – contain both sensory and motor fibers.

In a trauma or surgical resection, a nerve can be damaged, which is called a nerve defect. This defect needs to be repaired in order to regain full or partial sensory and motor function. Peripheral nerve injury is a major clinical problem and can result in neuropathic pain, which is pain arising as a direct consequence of a lesion or disease affecting the somatosensory system. Damaged nerve fibers continuously excite electric pulses, inducing pain or abnormal sensation dysesthesia. It has been shown that in allograft surgeries, post-operative neuropathic pain was present in some patients, but only if they had this condition pre-operatively. Patients without neuropathic pain before their surgery did not complain about neuropathic pain afterwards. Hence, allograft treatment does not seem to be a risk factor for this specific problem.

Golden standard therapy for transected nerves is an end-to-end repair of the nerve, also known as primary nerve repair. With a certain amount of tension on the nerve due to the injury, the blood flow to the nerve decreases, which can eventually lead to ischemia and nerve damage. The gap between the nerve ends could then, for example, be bridged by a nerve that is harvested from a less critical area from the same patient. The piece of nerve used in this case is called an autograft autotransplantation.

A commonly used nerve for autotransplantation is the sural nerve in the upper leg. Unfortunately, this treatment does have some disadvantages. First, there is a risk of donor site morbidity and functional loss. Secondly, patients have an increased risk of symptomatic neuroma formation. Thirdly, a longer anaesthesia time is needed because of the additional surgical site for the donor nerve. Lastly, higher costs also due to the extra surgical site. Despite these downsides, reducing the function of the affected area is beyond the risks committed with harvest of the donor nerve. In case of insufficient amount of autologous nerve tissue or the inability to attach both nerve ends securely and tension free, these two options are not possible.

Another option to bridge the gap is nerve allotransplantation. Nerve allografts are prepared from donated human nerve tissue. An allograft contains many of the beneficial characteristics of nerve autograft, such as three-dimensional microstructural scaffolding and protein components inherent to nerve tissue. One of the adverse effects of nerve allotransplantation is the immunogenic response. Tissue from another human being is used to restore the defect, which can induce an immunogenic response. An immune response against an allograft or xenograft is called transplant rejection. To prevent this rejection, new immunosuppressive techniques are performed on the graft, before it is transplanted into the receiver. The donated nerve tissue is disinfected, by selectively removing cellular components and debris to cleave growth inhibitors and then terminally sterilized. These procedures make the immunogenic response insignificant. Processed nerve allografts have now been used successfully to restore nerve continuity for over two decades.

== History ==
Rhazes, a Persian doctor, was the first who mentioned nerve repair in 900 AD. Nerve regeneration, is described for the first time in 1795 and in 1885 the first nerve allograft transplantation was reported. In 1945, after WWII, Sir Sunderland described the anatomy of the peripheral nerves and developed techniques to improve the outcomes of nerve repair. A successful regeneration for short allografts (<4 cm) was achieved. However, there was a period of failure to accomplish successful recovery for all the allografts longer than 4 cm. Therefore, 'The Peripheral Nerve Injury committee' did not support nerve allograft until, in the early 1970s the first successful clinical trials on longer grafts were reported by using a new combination of radiation and freeze-drying techniques. Nowadays rejection is still an adverse effect of nerve allotransplantation, but modern immunosuppressive regimens are used to prevent this rejection. This is why these days, rejection has become a very rare complication and nerve allograft has become more relevant.

== Anatomy and physiology of nerves ==
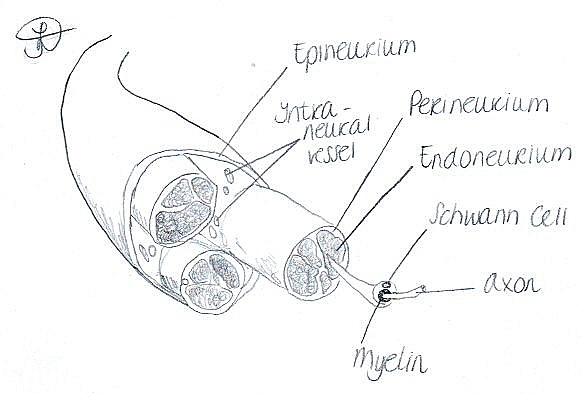

An axon is the part of a neuron which conducts electrical impulses. Axons are surrounded by myelin, which contain Schwann cells. Schwann cells improve the electrical conduction. The myelin is surrounded by endoneurium, which is a protective sheath of connective tissue. This is surrounded by perineurium and epineurium, of which the latter is the outmost layer of dense connective tissue. When it comes to nerve repair, it is crucial that those layers make a good connection.

== Transplantation techniques ==
There are several kinds of organ transplantation techniques.

- Nerve autotransplantation is transplantation within the same person. However, when there is a large nerve defect, there may be an insufficient number of nerves available for transplantation.

The nervus suralis, a nerve from the lower leg, is most often used. Consequently, the patient will miss the specific nerve used as an autograft; therefore a person's own nerves can not be used for an unlimited number of times.

- Nerve isotransplantation is tissue transplanted between two genetically identical persons. This technique can only be used if a person has a twin brother or sister.
- Nerve xenotransplantation means tissue transplanted between two different species. This technique is not often used.
- Nerve allotransplantation is the transplantation of a nerve to a receiver from a genetically non-identical donor of the same species.

== Clinic ==
The surgery of an allograft nerve can be explained in a few steps. First the surgeon has to prepare the broken nerve to do the standard operation procedures. This means the surgeon has to examine the local tissue and resecting scar tissue if needed. The proximal and distal segments of the injured nerves should be debrided to healthy tissue by visual and tactile signs. After that, the surgeon measures the distance between both nerve ends as well as the diameter of the damaged nerve. The processed nerve allografts come in different sizes, so that a gap can be closed without unwanted tension. When the surgeon has chosen the right allograft nerve, the procedure is no different from when an autograft is used. The same applies to the microsurgery, that a surgeon may use to repair the nerve. This means the sutures which connect the allograft with the damaged nerve are placed in the epineurium. So all other important anatomical structures of the nerve are kept intact.

== Autograft vs allograft ==
There are several factors that help a surgeon decide whether they should choose a nerve-autograft or an allograft. The differences between autografts and allografts are discussed above. The use of nerve autografts has some disadvantages. One is that the surgeon always creates a defect on the 'donorplace', from where the nerve is taken. Another disadvantage is that when the defect is large, the amount of available autografts may be insufficient.

Nerve allografts bring a possible solution for these problems. Because allografts are human nerves, processed in such a way that the immune response against the transplant is not provoked, the procedure differs little from the autograft-procedure except for the fact that there is no need to create a 'donorplace' defect. Therefore, allografts can be used more often in the same patient than autografts.

After the nerve is repaired, whether it is by using an autograft or an allograft, wallerian degeneration will be seen distal to the coaptation. This means that the part of the nerve that lies distal to the breaking point starts dissolving. The other end of the nerve will then grow back in this direction. The surgeon's transplant then only functions as the shell through which this growth can take place.

Studies suggest that nerve allografts work just as good as nerve autografts and are therefore a good alternative to the classic nerve autograft.

== Gap length ==
Currently nerve reconstruction is limited in length. There is a relationship between the length of the nerve gap and the level of recovery following nerve repair. Two large clinical studies have divided three different gap lengths: 5-14mm, 15-29mm and 30-50mm nerve gaps. After adjustment for technical failures. The nerve grafts of 5-14mm had a 100% meaningful level of functional recovery in both studies. For nerve grafts above 15mm is seen in both studies a meaningful recovery around 80%. It seems likely that a shorter nerve gap has a better recovery, but despite that a significant difference was not found.

== Motor vs sensory nerves ==
Since some studies on nerve allotransplantation determined the outcomes of sensory, motor and mixed nerves separately, the meaningful recovery for each nerve type has been assessed. Comparison of these outcomes has found no difference in successful recovery. In other words, the sensation and movement of the affected body parts, in most studies the forearm, equally improved. Successful recovery of all three nerve types was achieved in approximately 80 to 85% of cases. Mixed nerves had a slightly lower recovery rate than sensory and motor nerves, but the success rate was still within the range just mentioned. Concluding, allograft surgery can be appropriately used for the functional repair of nerve injury in sensory, motor and mixed nerves.

== Conclusion ==
The use of nerve allografts is a relatively new development and therefore autografts are currently still used more frequently. Efforts are being made to determine which procedure, i.e. autograft or allograft surgery, is preferred for each nerve type, but more research needs to be done. No comparison of these two procedures has been made in one single clinical study, let alone in a randomized controlled trial. This specific study type is of crucial value for evidence-based medicine.
