= Sural nerve =

Cutaneous nerve of the leg

sural nerve
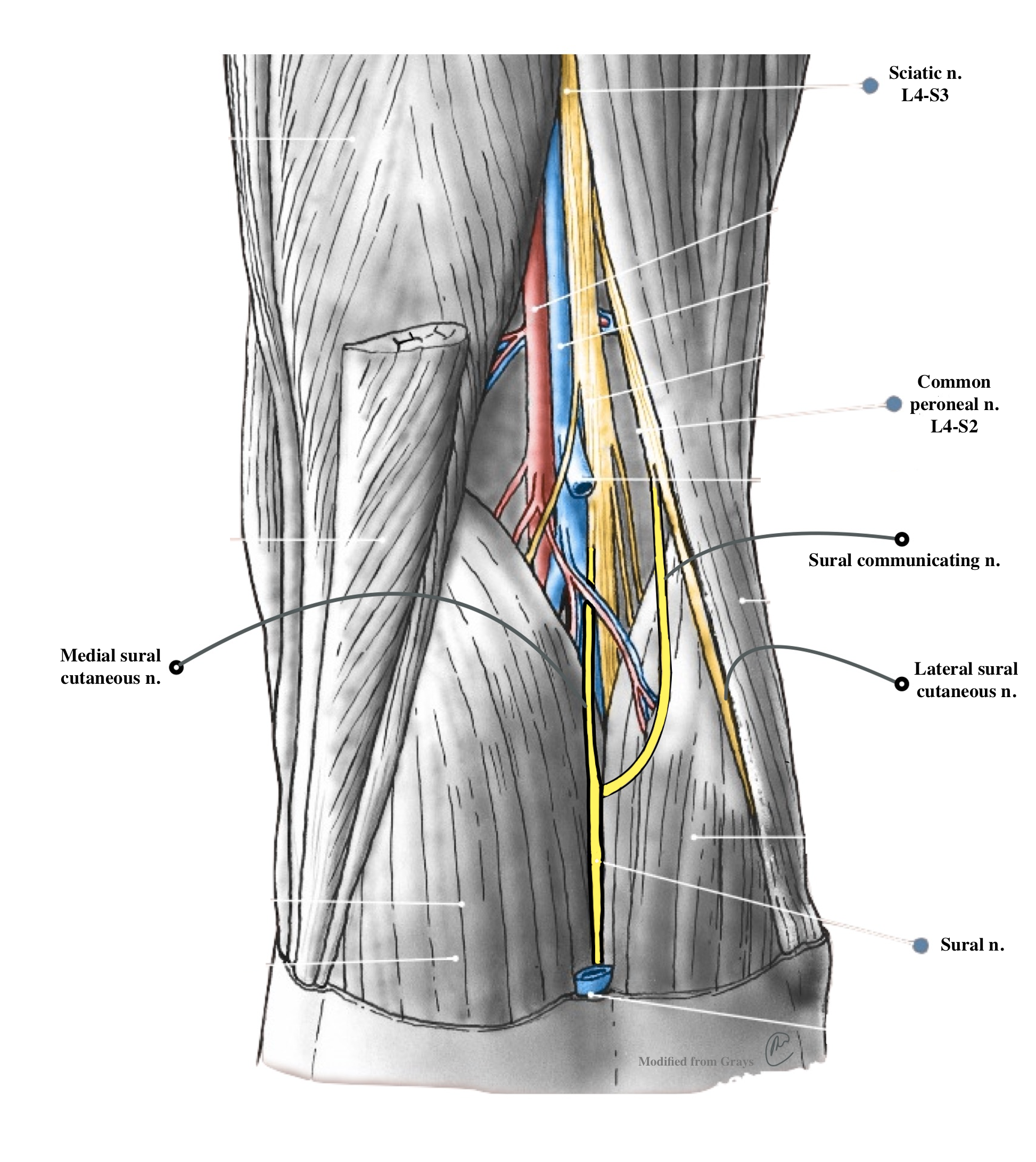
- Dissection of popliteal space to show the formation of a type 1 sural nerve

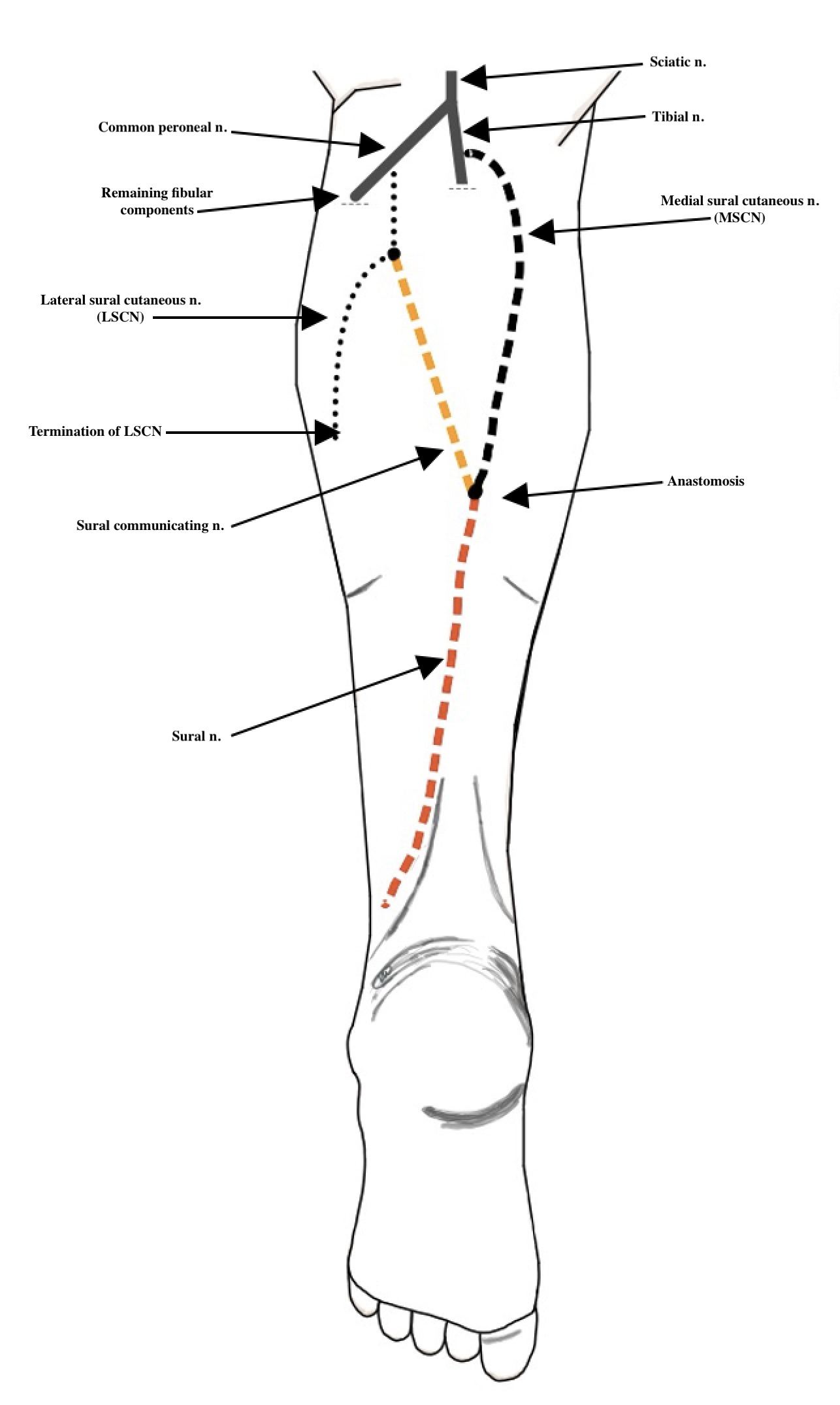
- Cartoon version adapted from Steele et al. depicting type 1 sural nerve

Details
- From: Union of Medial sural cutaneous nerve + sural communicating nerve
- To: Sural nerve forms after piercing out of deep fascia or after an anastomosis, terminates as lateral dorsal cutaneous nerve
- Innervates: Supplies cutaneous sensation to the skin of the posterolateral leg and lateral ankle.

Identifiers
- Latin: nervus suralis
- MeSH: D013497
- TA98: A14.2.07.062
- TA2: 6586
- FMA: 44688

The sural nerve (L4-S1) is generally considered a pure cutaneous nerve of the posterolateral leg to the lateral ankle. The sural nerve originates from a combination of either the sural communicating branch and medial sural cutaneous nerve, or the lateral sural cutaneous nerve. This group of nerves is termed the sural nerve complex. There are eight documented variations of the sural nerve complex. Once formed the sural nerve takes its course midline posterior to posterolateral around the lateral malleolus. The sural nerve terminates as the lateral dorsal cutaneous nerve.

== Anatomy ==
The sural nerve (L4-S1) is a cutaneous sensory nerve of the posterolateral calf with cutaneous innervation to the distal one-third of the lower leg. Formation of the sural nerve is the result of either anastomosis of the medial sural cutaneous nerve and the sural communicating nerve, or it may be found as a continuation of the lateral sural cutaneous nerve traveling parallel to the medial sural cutaneous nerve. The sural nerve specifically innervates cutaneous sensorium over the posterolateral leg and lower lateral ankle via lateral calcaneal branches.

== Innervation ==
The sural nerve provides cutaneous innervation to the skin of the posterior to posterolateral leg.

== Anatomic Course ==
Grossly, the course of this nerve leads it from its highly varied anastomotic formation to its more predictable terminal course down the remaining posterior leg. The anastomosis forming the sural nerve typically occurs in the deep fascia above or within the surrounding space above the gastrocnemius muscle. Once formed, the sural nerve then pierces out of a fascial crura and travels from its posterior midline position wrapping laterally around the lateral malleolus; once around the lateral malleolus the name of the nerve changes to the lateral dorsal cutaneous nerve. Eight variations of sural nerve origin have been described with categorical subtyping.

== Anatomic Formation ==
The nerves contributing to the formation of the sural nerve (medial sural cutaneous nerve, lateral sural cutaneous nerve, sural communicating nerve) are deemed the sural nerve complex by some anatomists and surgeons. Eight formations of the sural nerve complex have been described in cadaveric studies.

=== Morphometrics ===
The pathway of the sural nerve (once formed) is consistent as it travels superficially in the posterior leg over the distal part of the gastrocnemius over the beginning of the achilles tendon and then travels parallel to the achilles with the small saphenous vein to send of lateral calcaneal branches while the remaining nerve passes under the lateral malleolus and finally finding its terminal name as the sural nerve becomes the lateral dorsal cutaneous nerve. The formation patterns of the sural nerve complex is much more complicated and highly varied as documented by anatomists. The most common formation is the anastomotic scenario described above; the sural communicating branch joins the medial sural cutaneous nerve to become the sural nerve. Type 1 and 2 sural nerve complex formation prevalence is estimated up to greater than 70%, Although the remaining types (3-8) provide difficulty in making consistent clinical approximation of this nerve in the random population.

The sural nerve then travels out of deep fascia to the subcutaneous posterior sura. Although, these types of sural nerve complex (type 1 and 2) are of the highest prevalence, there are multiple scenarios which other contributing nerves that range in morphology of formation, sural nerve size, and location of the sural nerve union. Anatomists limit the name of the sural nerve from its origins after an anastomosis of the SCB (type 1) and medial sural cutaneous nerve or we name it for when it penetrates out of the deep fascia of the posterior sura.

== Clinical significance ==
The sural nerve has a purely sensory function, and so its removal results in only a relatively minor consequential deficit. Due to its large size and significant length it has had a significant contribution in medicine twofold; the sural nerve is the most frequently accessed donor nerve site for peripheral nerve grafting and serves as the primary diagnostic site for nerve conduction studies for understanding of peripheral nerve pathologies. It is frequently a site of iatrogenic nerve injury during percutaneous repair of the Achilles tendon or surgical interventions on the lower extremity.

The sural nerve is also a source for iatrogenic injuries during orthopedic interventions of the lower ankle and extremity. For this reason, and due to its large size and significant length it has had a significant contribution in medicine in the form of nerve biopsy and diagnostics of peripheral nerve diseases. Sural mononeuropathy is uncommon, however If affected, it can be due to diabetes, peripheral neuropathies, or trauma. Sometimes inflammatory or vasculitic diseases will selectively involve the sural nerve. In addition, the sural nerve will be involved in any kind of generalized peripheral sensory or sensorimotor neuropathy. Sensory changes from sural neuropathy are variable but usually occur in the posterolateral aspect of the leg and the dorsolateral foot. These can sometimes be painful with paresthesias and dysesthesias. Nerve conduction studies can be used to delineate sural nerve lesions. Treatment will depend on the cause of the neuropathy. Occasionally biopsy of the nerve is performed for diagnostic purposes. For example, ganglions are usually resected. Traumatic neuropathy is usually treated non-surgically. It is often the donor nerve when a nerve allograft is performed.

=== Sural nerve block ===
A sural nerve block can be used for quick anesthetization to the foot and lower leg. Because this technique requires few injections to reach adequate anesthesia, a smaller volume of anesthetic is needed. The sural nerve is rather superficial, which makes it more accessible to surgeons. Therefore, it is relatively easier than other procedures. Also, due to its superficial properties, the sural nerve is easily blocked at multiple levels at or above the ankle. In one study, regional anesthesia of the foot and ankle, when performed by surgeons, was completely successful 95% of the time. Sural nerve block is not advised if a patient is allergic to the anesthetic solution, has infected tissue at the injection site, has severe bleeding disorder, or has preexisting neurological damage.

== Additional images ==
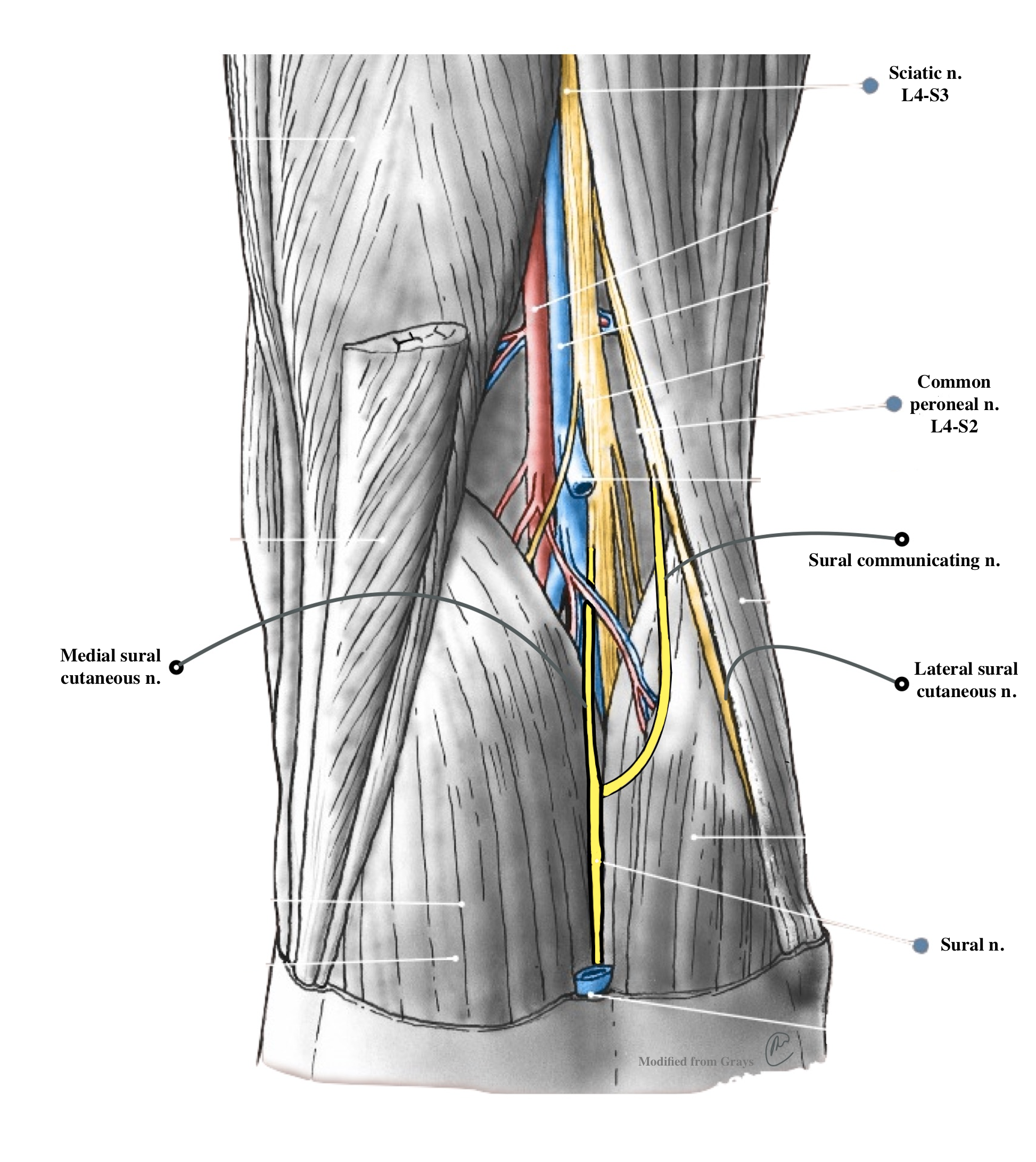
Dissection of popliteal space to show the formation of a type 1 sural nerve

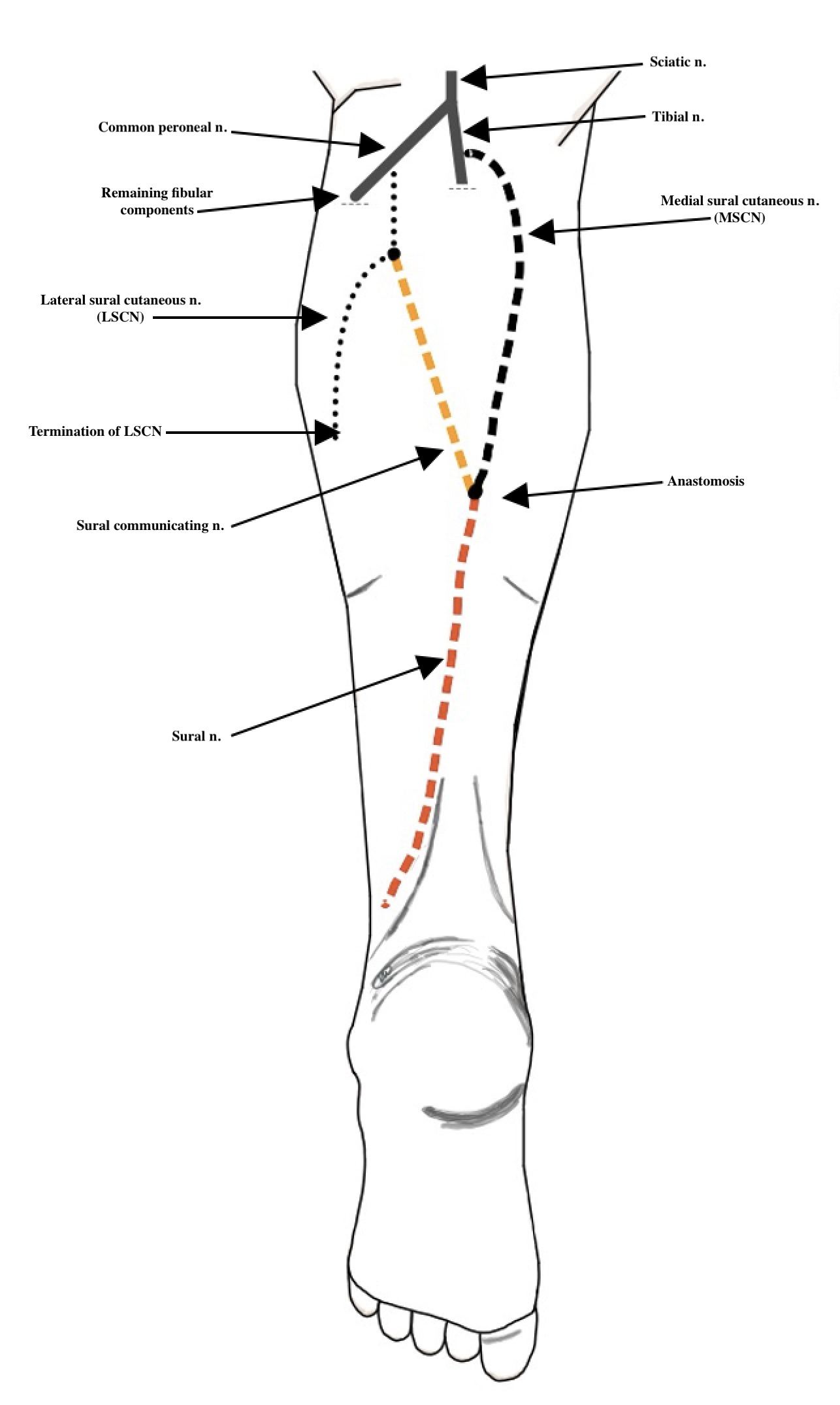
Cartoon version adapted from Steele et al. depicting type 1 sural nerve

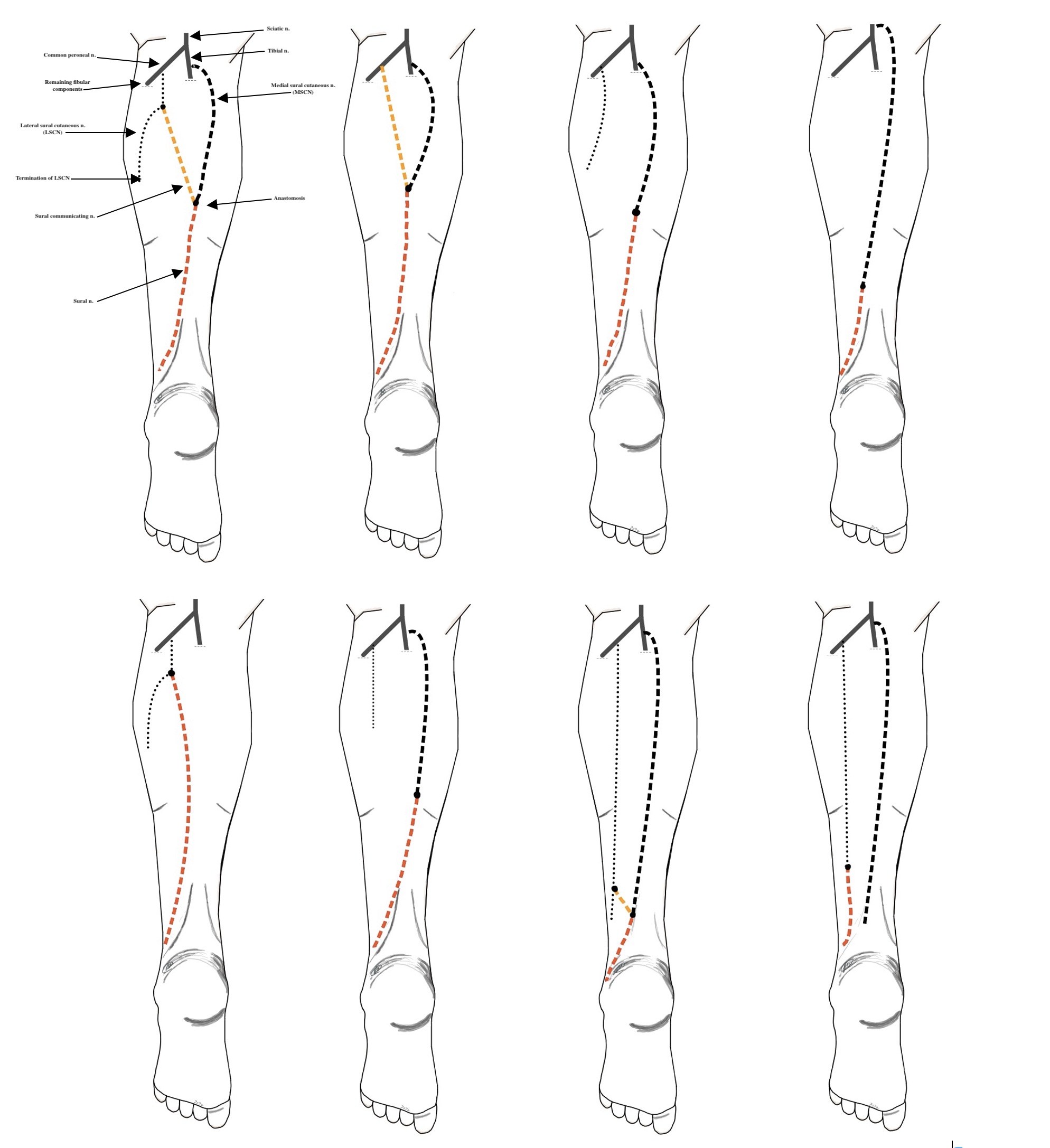
8 documented types of sural nerve formation

Areas of skin sensation supplied by nerves in the leg.

Areas of skin supplied by nerves of the leg - the sural nerve supplies the lateral ankle.

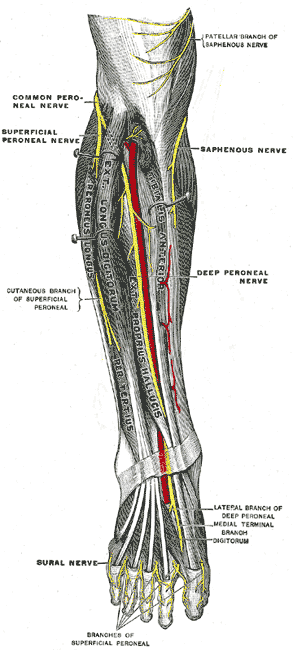
Deep nerves of the front of the leg.

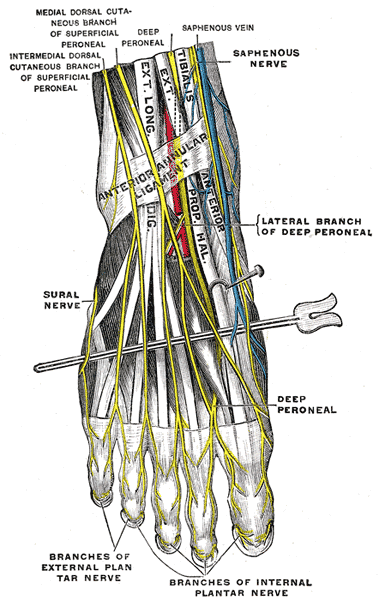
Course of nerves at the bottom of the foot.
