= Lateral sural cutaneous nerve =

Sensory nerve of the leg that supplies part of the posterolateral side of the leg

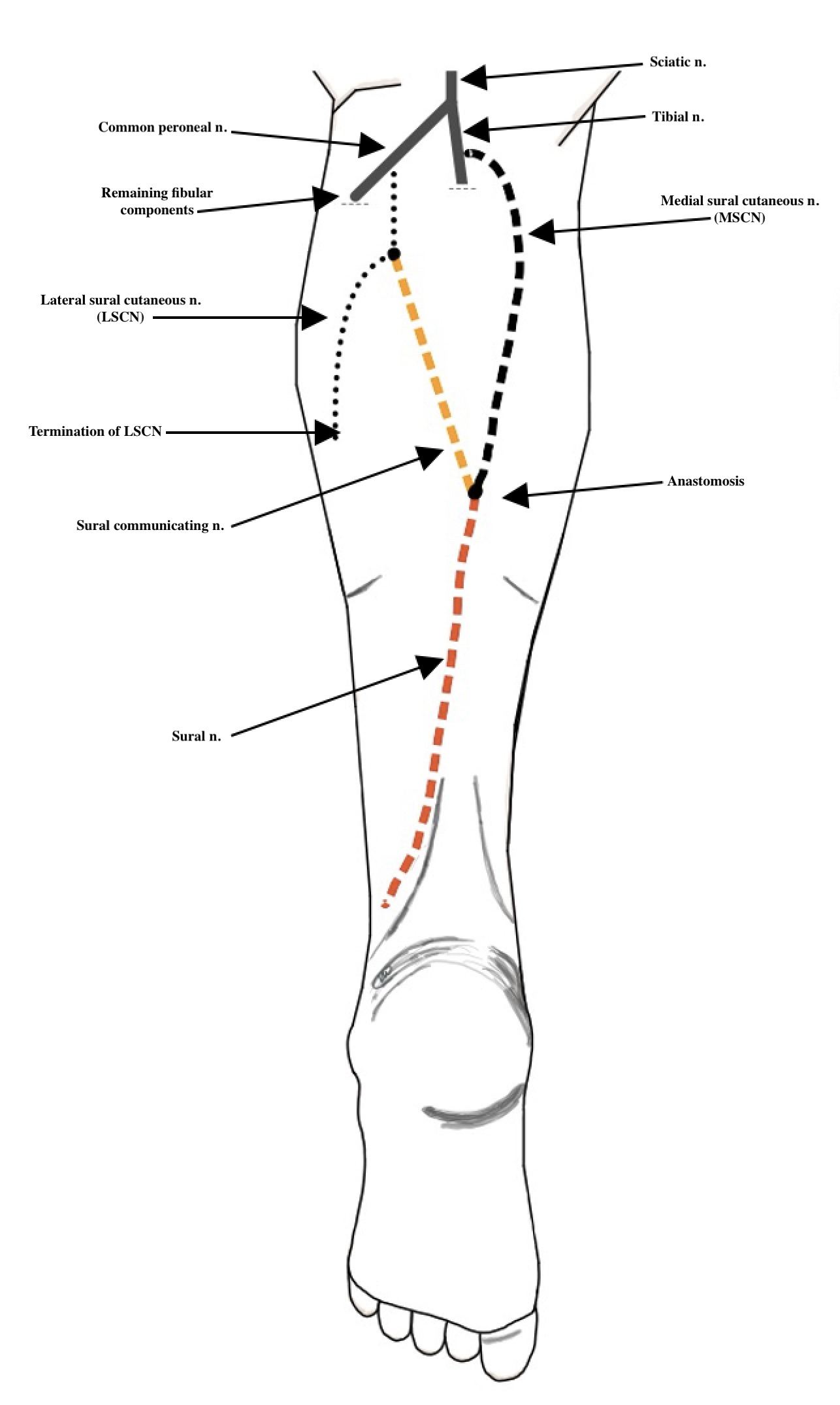
- Cutaneous nerves of the right lower extremity. Front and posterior views. Lateral sural cutaneous nerve is not labeled. (Com. peroneal labeled in blue at center left and center right.)

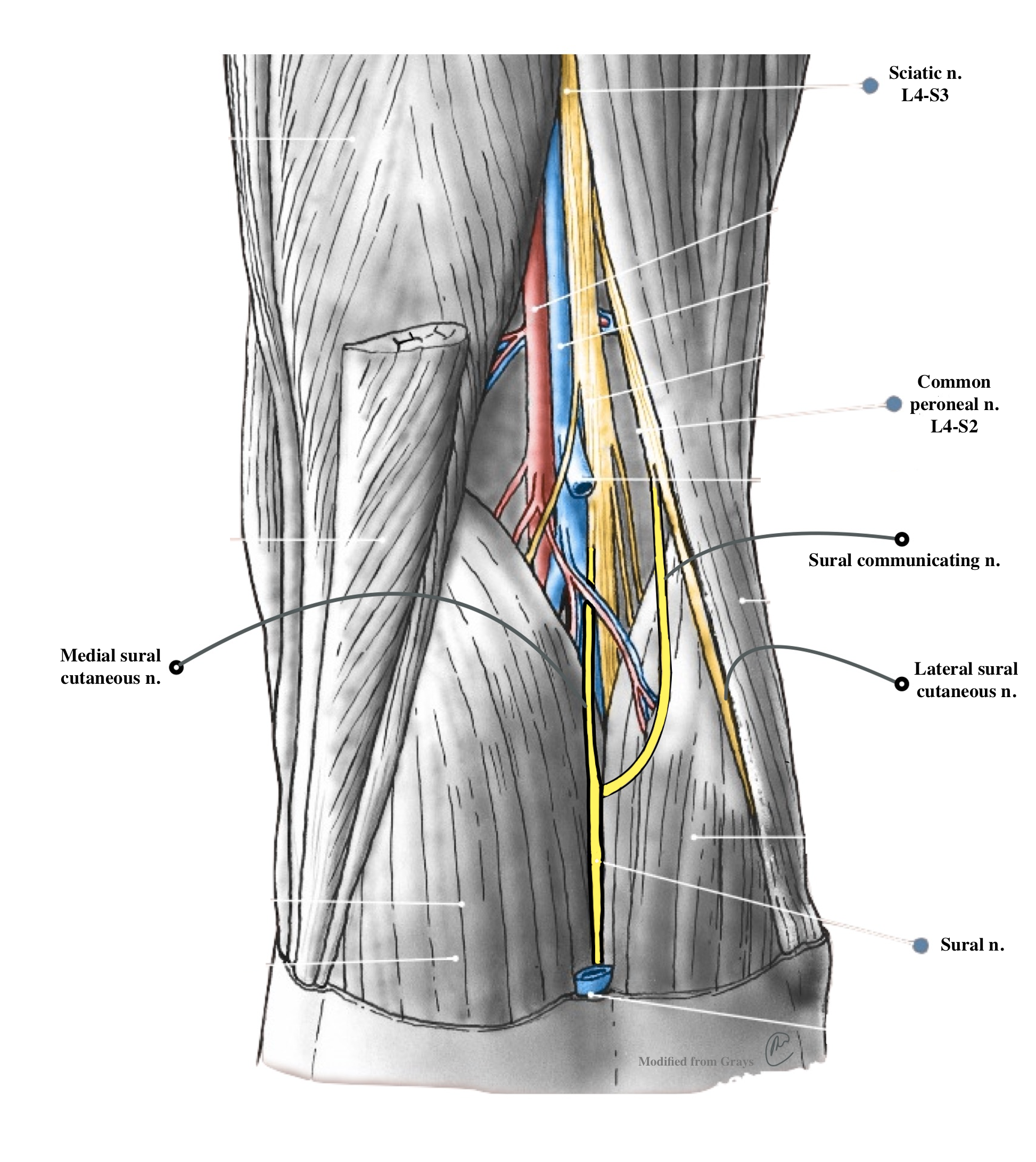
- Dissection of popliteal space to show the formation of a type 1 sural nerve

Details
- From: common peroneal nerve
- To: cutaneous innervation of the lateral calf

Identifiers
- Latin: nervus cutaneus surae lateralis
- TA98: A14.2.07.048
- TA2: 6572
- FMA: 44697

The lateral sural cutaneous nerve of the lumbosacral plexus supplies the skin on the posterior and lateral surfaces of the leg. The lateral sural cutaneous nerve originates from the common fibular nerve(L4-S2) and is the terminal branch of the common fibular nerve.

== Sural communicating branch ==
One branch, the sural communicating nerve or colloquially known as the peroneal anastomotic (n. communicans fibularis), arises from sciatic origins near the head of the fibula, crosses the lateral head of the gastrocnemius to the middle of the leg, and joins with the medial sural cutaneous nerve to form the sural nerve

== Variation ==
Another branch observed, that is mentioned in passing in previous literature is the medial branch of the lateral sural cutaneous nerve.

In a 2021 study by Steele et al. (Annals of Anatomy), a medial branch of the lateral sural cutaneous nerve was observed in approximately 36% of lower extremities dissected (n=208) with an average diameter of 1.47 ± 0.655 mm with a 95% CI of 1.31 – 1.625 mm. This branch was noted to travel in a subcutaneous plane over the sural nerve to the posteromedial aspect of the ankle. "The lateral branch of the LSCN traveled the expected course over the fibula in the superficial fascia of the posterolateral compartment of the leg, while the medial branch terminates into the lower posteromedial aspect of ankle."

== Additional images ==
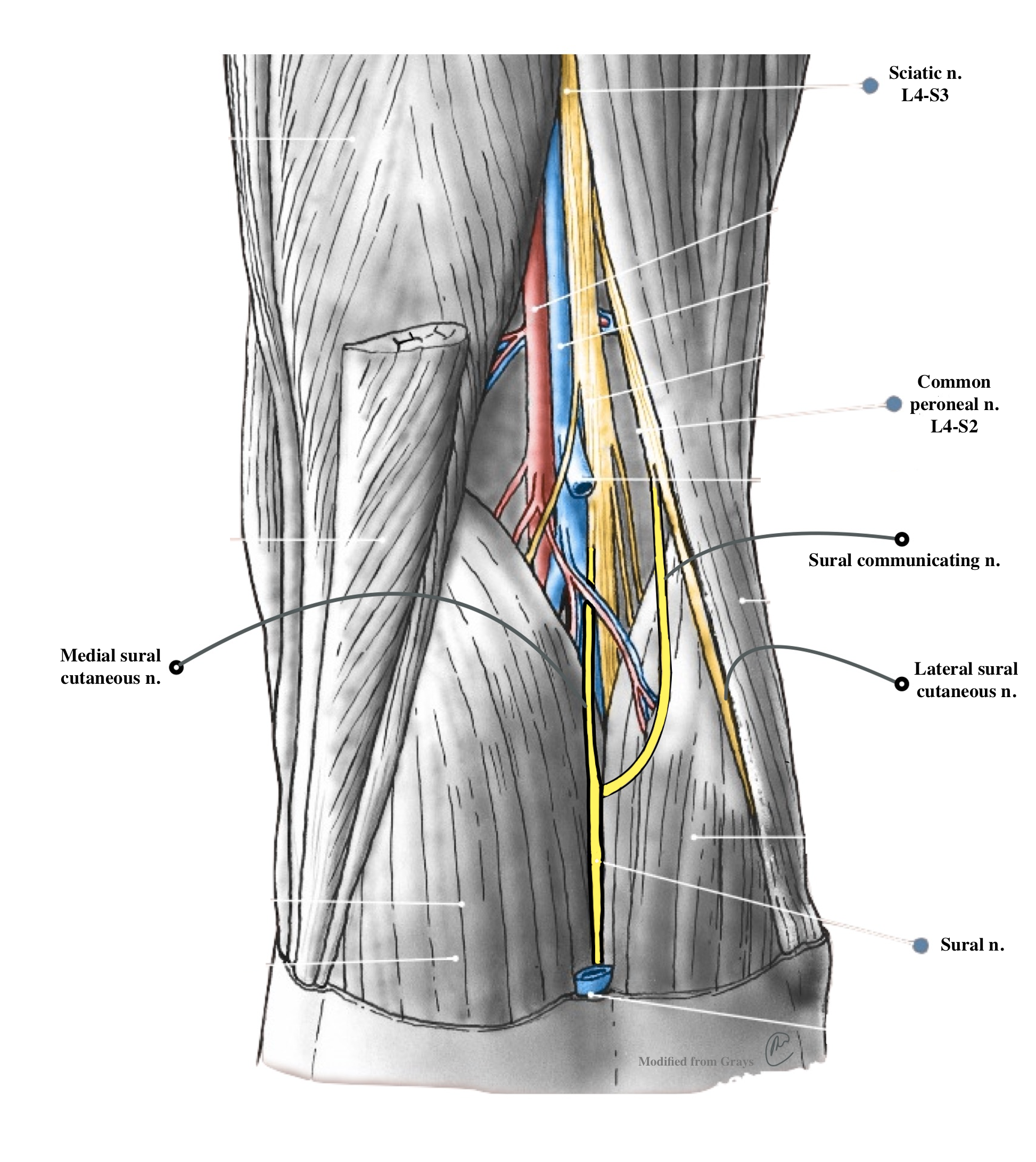
Most common formation (type 1) of the sural nerve depicted in the popliteal fossa

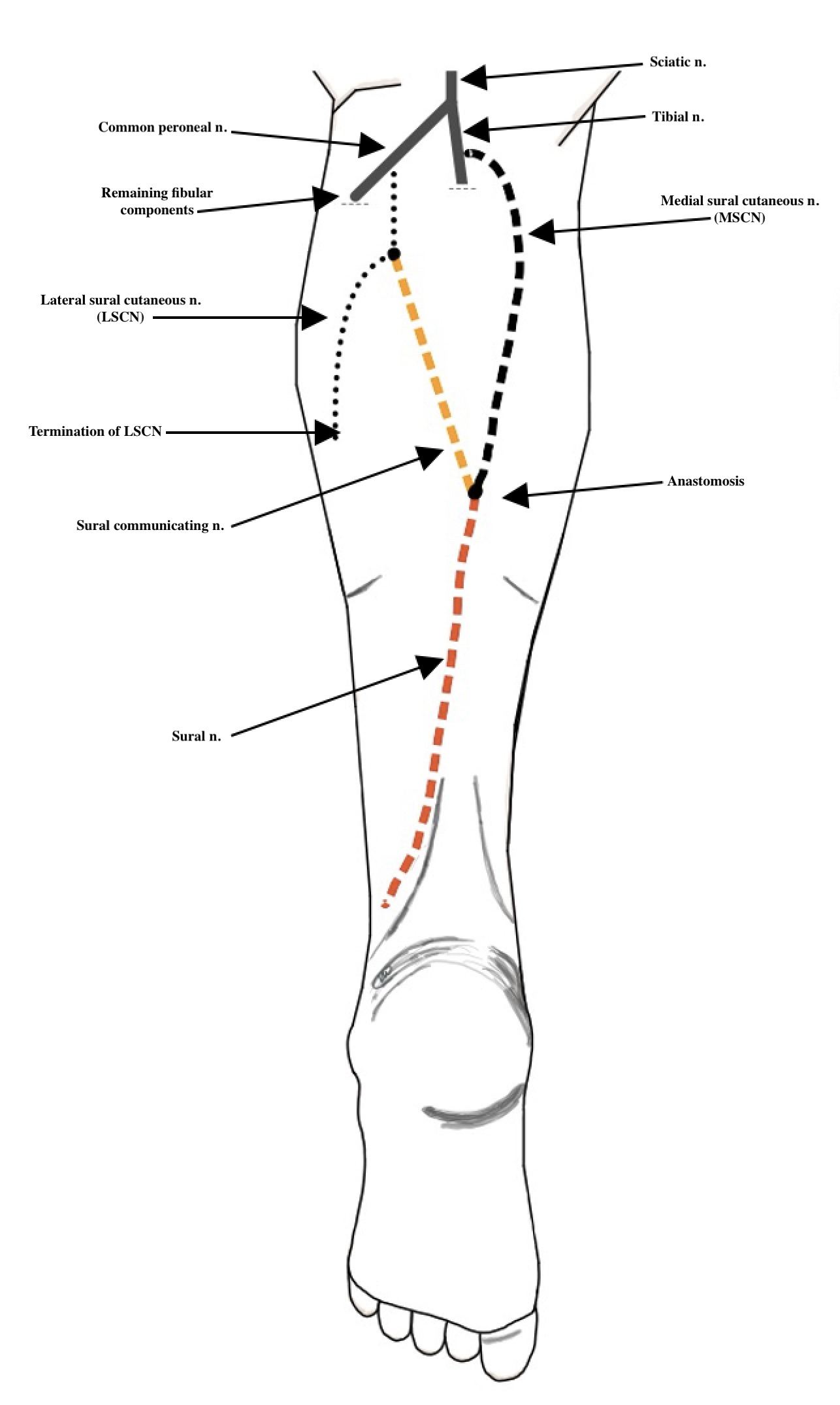
Most common formation of the sural nerve by Steele et al.

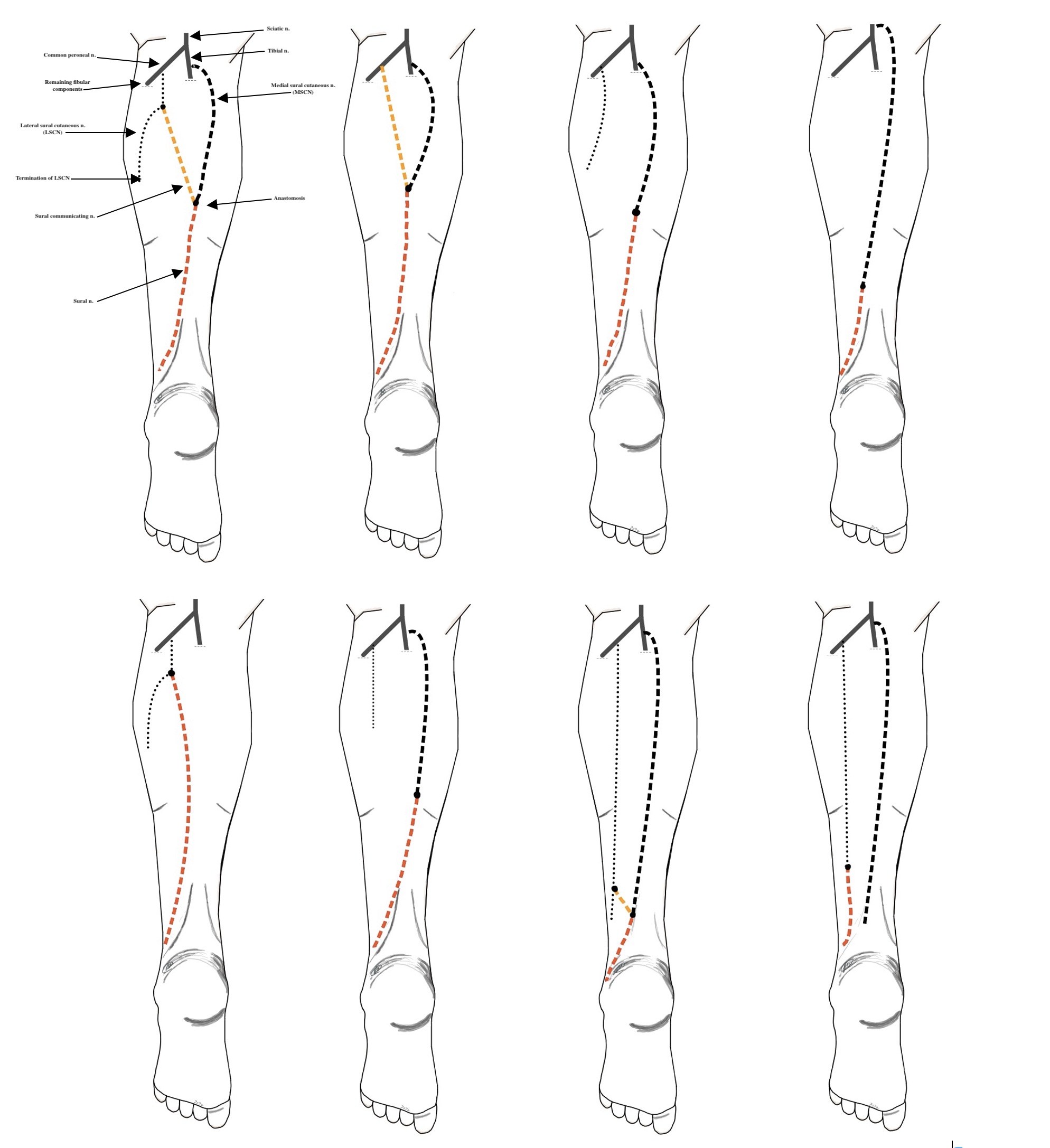
8 documented types of sural nerve formation

Areas of skin sensation supplied by nerves in the leg.

Areas of skin supplied by nerves of the leg - the sural nerve supplies the lateral ankle.

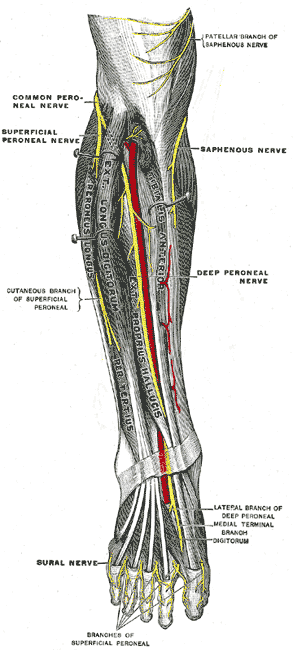
Deep nerves of the front of the leg.

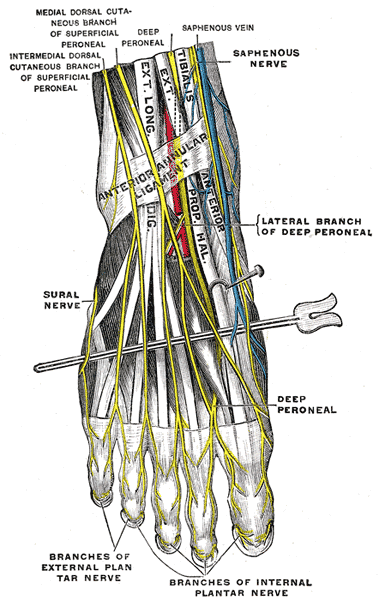
Course of nerves at the bottom of the foot.
