= Medial sural cutaneous nerve =

Sensory nerve of the leg that supplies part of the medial side of the leg

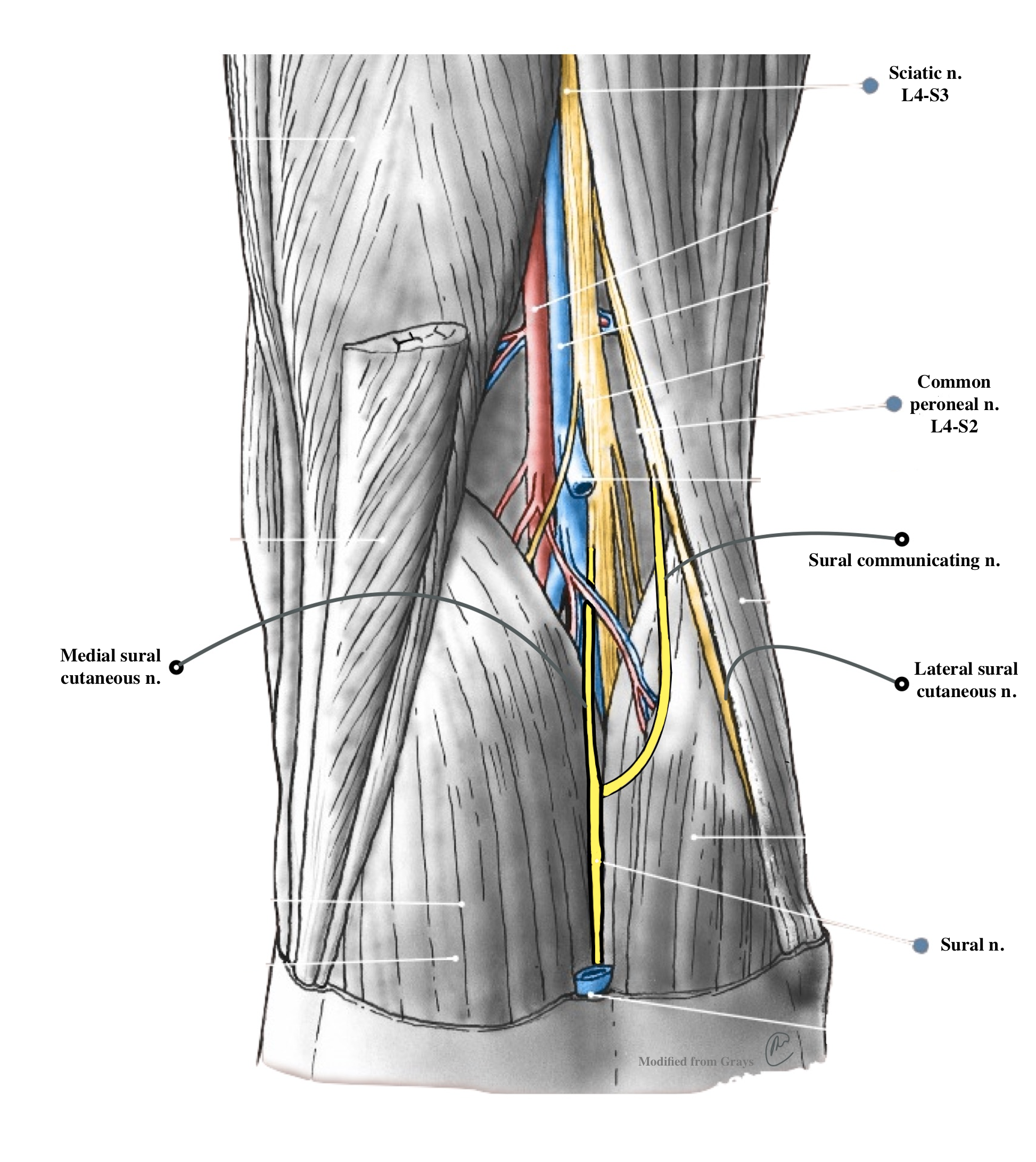
- Medial sural cutaneous nerve shown in its common anatomic formation

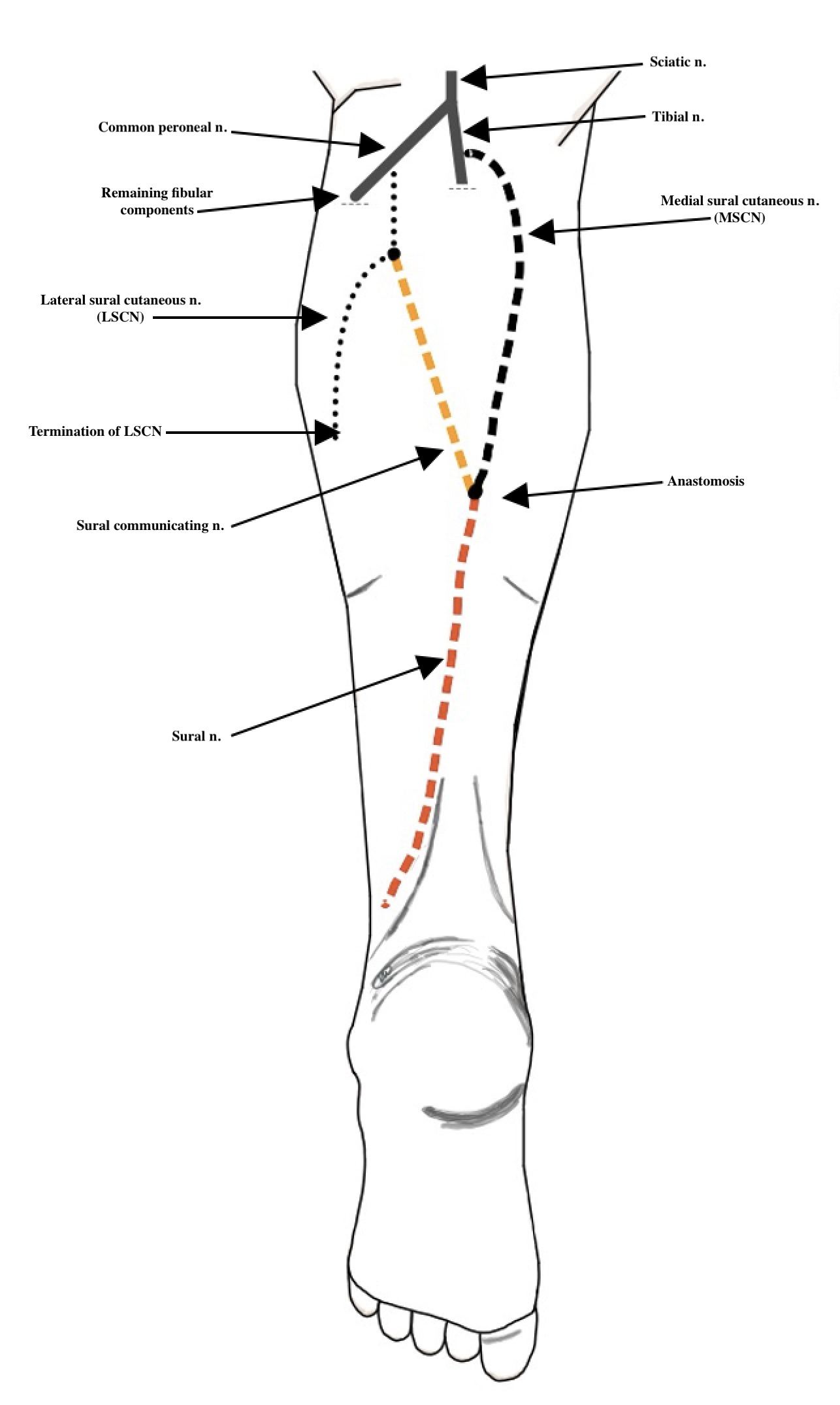
- Cartoon version adapted from Steele et al. depicting type 1 sural nerve with contribution of medial sural cutaneous nerve and sural communicating branch

Details
- From: Tibial nerve

Identifiers
- Latin: n. cutaneus surae medialis
- TA98: A14.2.07.061
- TA2: 6585
- FMA: 44687

The medial sural cutaneous nerve (L4-S3) is a sensory nerve of the leg. It supplies cutaneous innervation to the posteromedial leg.

== Structure ==
The medial sural cutaneous nerve originates from the posterior aspect of the tibial nerve of the sciatic nerve. It descends between the two heads of the gastrocnemius muscle. Around the middle of the back of the leg, it pierces the deep fascia to become superficial. It unites with the lateral sural cutaneous nerve to form the sural nerve.

=== Morphometric properties ===
According to a large cadaveric study in which 208 sural nerves were dissected in their native position (by Steele et al.) the medial sural cutaneous nerve was consistently present in most lower extremities. This information aligns with other research as well. Only one sample in Steele et al. did not contain a medial sural cutaneous nerve. The diameter (at the medial sural cutaneous nerve origin) is found to be 2.74mm ± 0.93 (2.62–2.86) in 207 samples. Two new variations (as of 2021) of the sural nerve complex were observed where the MSCN is observed to travel to the lateral ankle and provides the branches for the lateral calcaneal nerves of the lateral ankle. Normally the sural nerve serves this purpose.

== Additional images ==
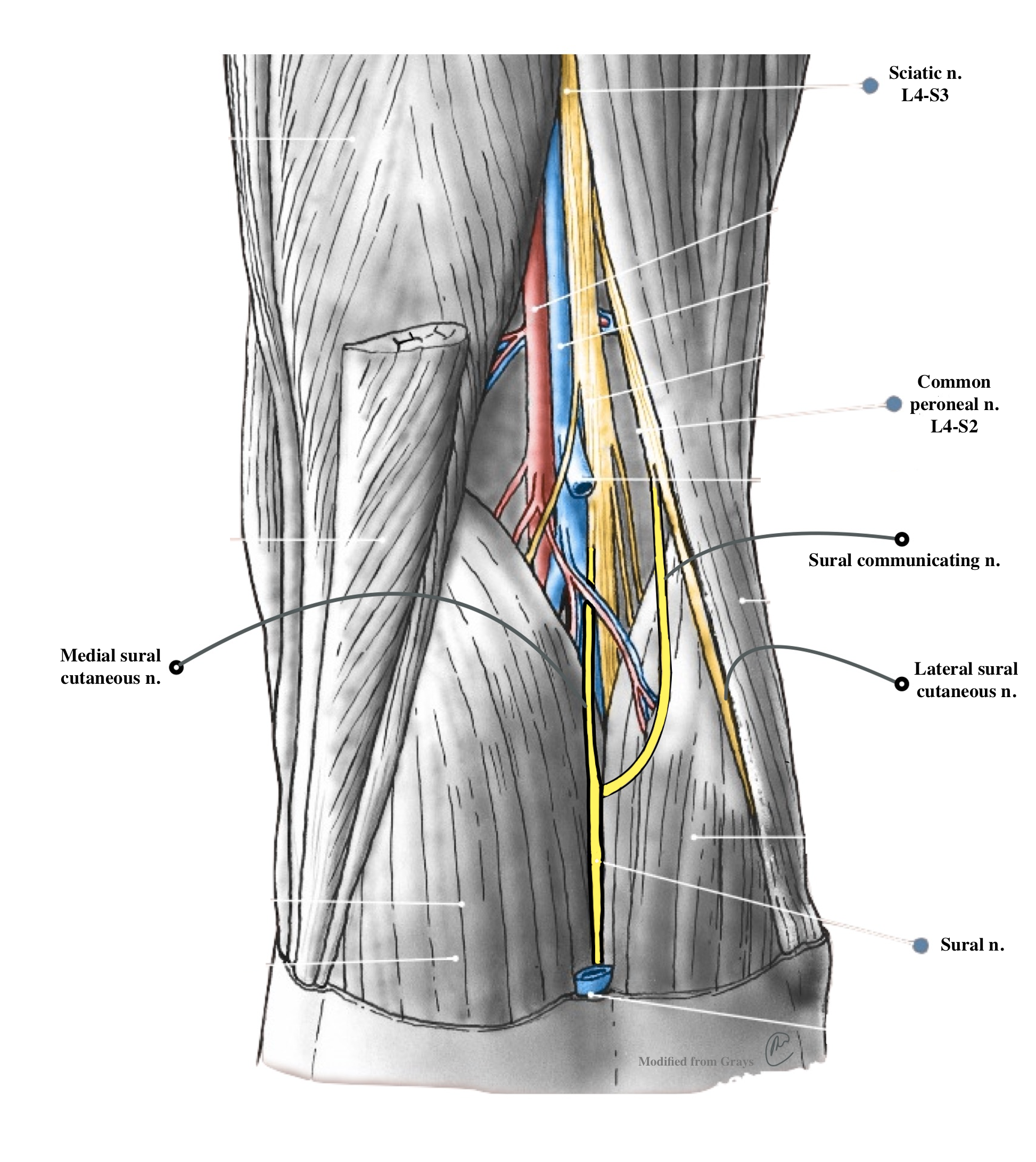
Most common formation (type 1) of the sural nerve depicted in the popliteal fossa

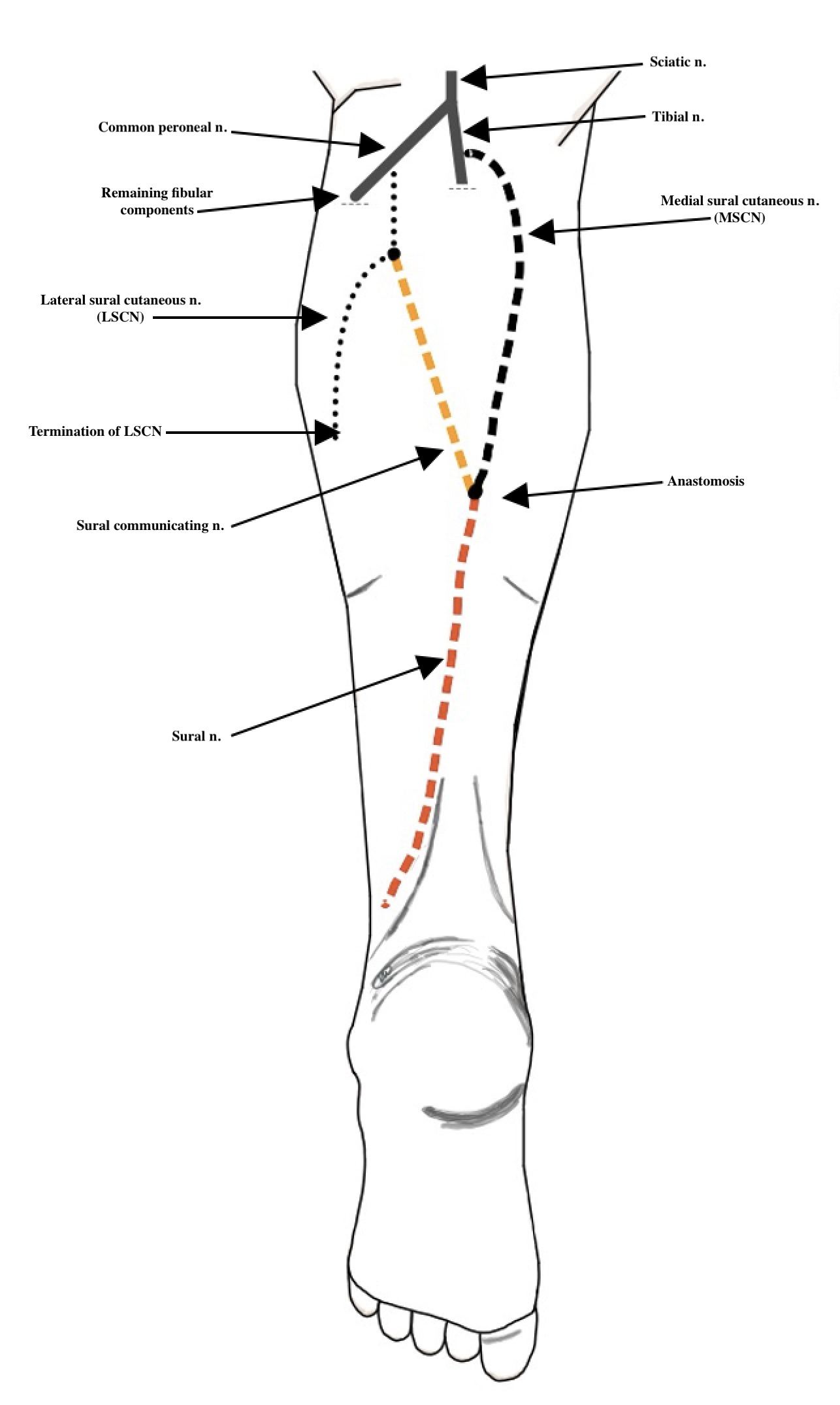
Most common formation of the sural nerve by Steele et al.

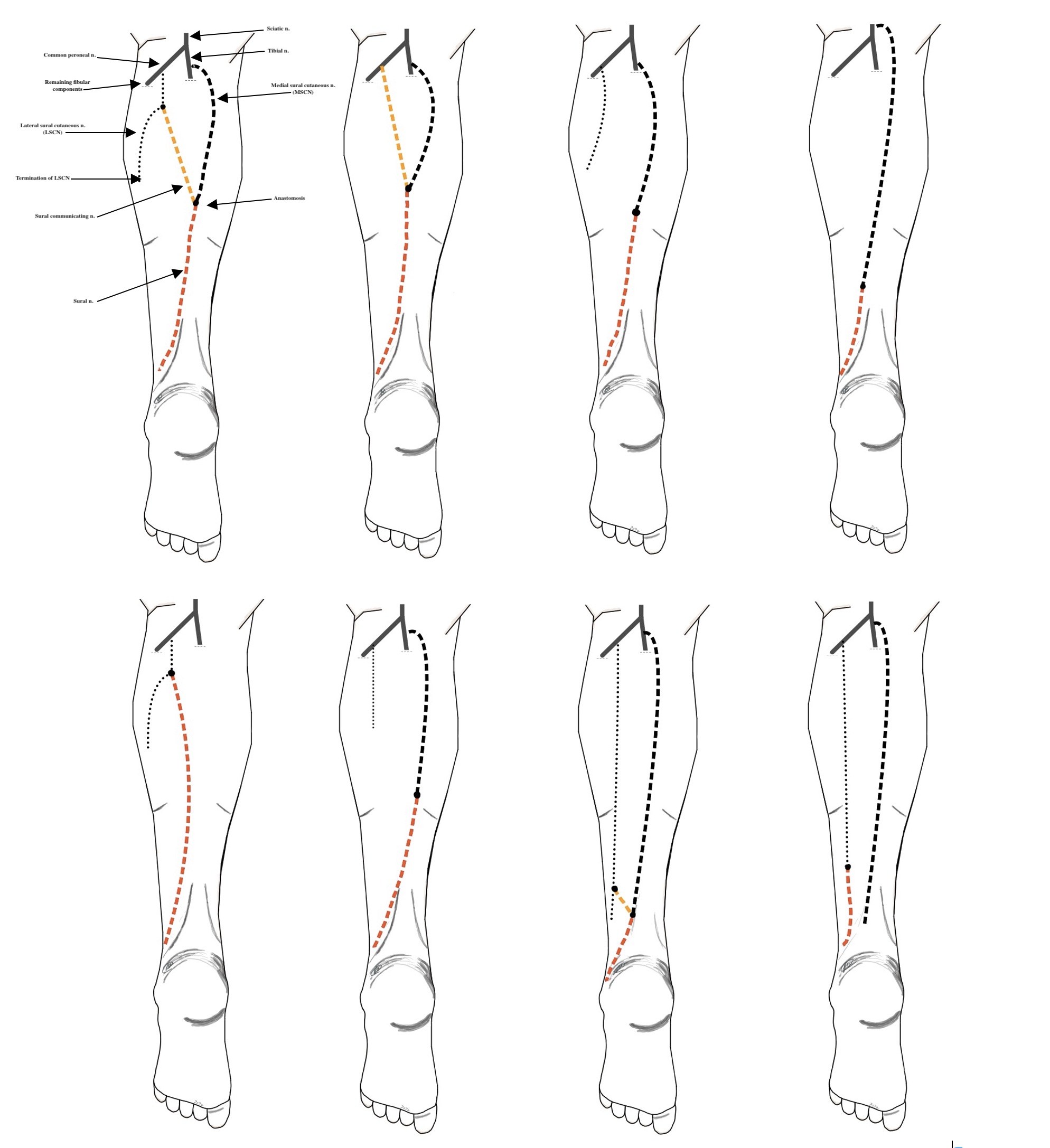
8 documented types of sural nerve formation

Areas of skin sensation supplied by nerves in the leg.

Areas of skin supplied by nerves of the leg - the sural nerve supplies the lateral ankle.

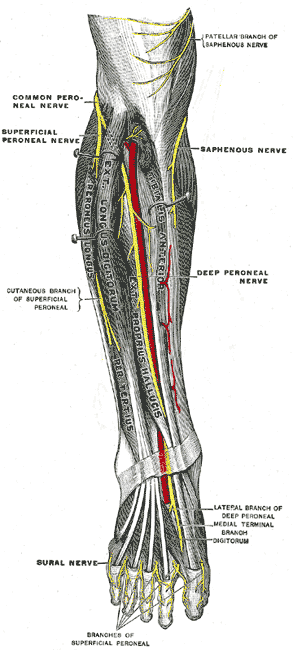
Deep nerves of the front of the leg.

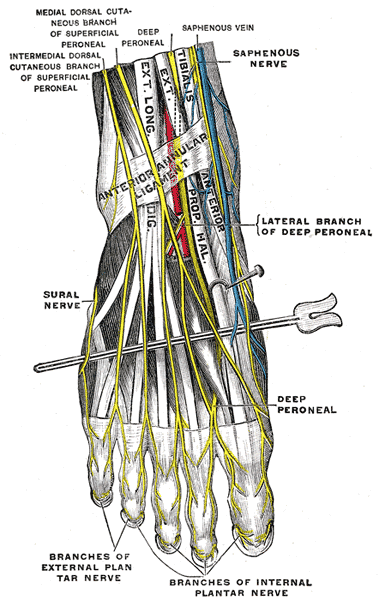
Course of nerves at the bottom of the foot.
