= Plantar nerve =

Pair of nerves innervating the sole of the foot

Diagram of the segmental distribution of the cutaneous nerves of the sole of the foot

The plantar nerves are a pair of nerves innervating the sole of the foot. They arise from the posterior branch of the tibial nerve.

== Medial plantar nerve ==
The medial plantar nerve supplies: the abductor hallucis, the flexor digitorum brevis, the flexor hallucis brevis and the first lumbrical. Cutaneous distribution of the medial plantar nerve is to the medial sole and medial three and one half toes, including the nail beds on the dorsum (like the median nerve in the hand). Mnemonic LAFF muscles (pronounced "laugh") L – first Lumbrical, A – Abductor Hallucis, F – Flexor digitorum brevis, F – flexor hallucis brevis.

== Lateral plantar nerve ==
The lateral plantar nerve supplies quadratus plantae, flexor digiti minimi brevis, adductor hallucis, the dorsal and plantar interossei, three lateral lumbricals and abductor digiti minimi. Cutaneous innervation is to the lateral sole and lateral one and one half toes (like the ulnar nerve).
