= Hallucis muscle =

Hallucis muscle may refer to:

- Abductor hallucis muscle
- Adductor hallucis muscle
- Extensor hallucis longus muscle
- Extensor hallucis brevis muscle
- Flexor hallucis brevis muscle
- Flexor hallucis longus muscle
