= Medial calcaneal branches of the tibial nerve =

- Diagram of the segmental distribution of the cutaneous nerves of the sole of the foot.

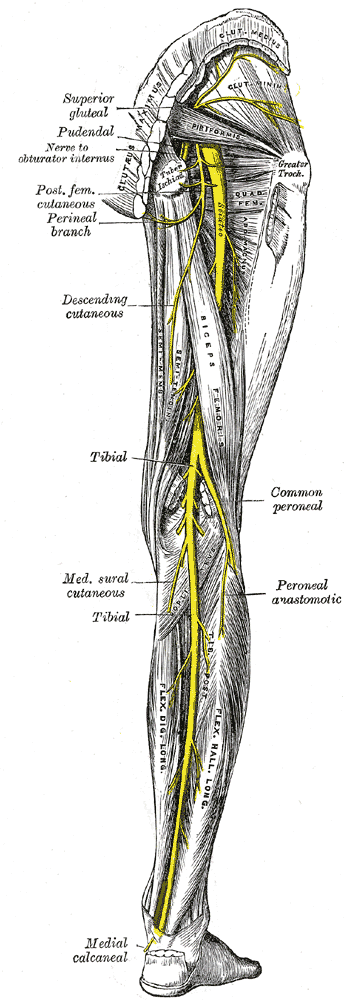
- Nerves of the right lower extremity Posterior view. (medial calcaneal labeled at bottom left.) Diagram of the segmental distribution of the cutaneous nerves of the sole of the foot.

Details
- From: tibial nerve

Identifiers
- Latin: rami calcanei mediales nervi tibialis
- TA98: A14.2.07.065
- TA2: 6589
- FMA: 44710

The medial calcaneal branches of the tibial nerve (internal calcaneal branches) perforate the laciniate ligament, and supply the skin of the heel and medial side of the sole of the foot.

== Structure ==
The medial calcaneal nerve originates either from the tibial nerve or the lateral plantar nerve. It splits into two cutaneous branches.

== Function ==
The medial calcaneal nerve provides sensory innervation to the medial side of the heel.

== See also ==
- Cutaneous innervation of the lower limbs
