= List of abductors of the human body =

Abduction is an anatomical term of motion referring to a movement which draws a limb out to the side, away from the median sagittal plane of the body. It is thus opposed to adduction.

== Upper limb ==
=== Arm and shoulder ===
- of arm at shoulder (raising arm)
  - Supraspinatus 0–15
  - Deltoid 15–90

=== Hand and wrist ===
- of hand at wrist
  - Flexor carpi radialis
  - Extensor carpi radialis longus
  - Extensor carpi radialis brevis
- of finger
  - Abductor digiti minimi
  - Dorsal interossei of the hand
- of thumb
  - Abductor pollicis longus
  - Abductor pollicis brevis

== Lower limb ==
- of femur at hip
  - Gluteus maximus muscle
  - Gluteus medius muscle
  - Gluteus minimus muscle
  - Sartorius muscle
  - Tensor fasciae latae muscle
  - Piriformis
- of toe
  - Abductor hallucis
  - Abductor digiti minimi
  - Dorsal interossei of the foot

== Other ==
- vocal folds
  - Posterior cricoarytenoid muscle
- eyeball
  - Lateral rectus muscle
  - Superior oblique muscle
  - Inferior oblique muscle
