= Digitorum muscle =

Digitorum muscle may refer to:

In the upper extremities:

- Extensor digitorum muscle
- Flexor digitorum profundus muscle
- Flexor digitorum superficialis muscle

In the lower extremities:

- Extensor digitorum brevis muscle
- Extensor digitorum longus muscle
- Flexor digitorum brevis muscle
- Flexor digitorum longus muscle
