= Medial plantar nerve =

Larger of the two terminal divisions of the tibial nerve

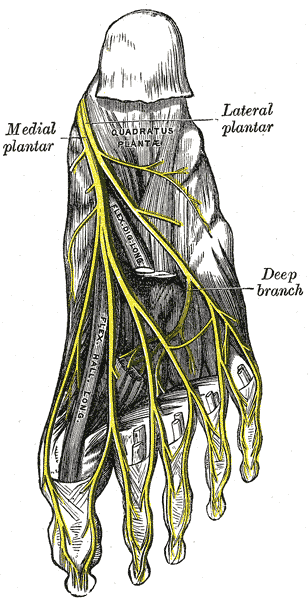
- The plantar nerves.

Details
- From: Tibial nerve
- Innervates: Sole, abductor hallucis muscle, flexor digitorum brevis muscle, flexor hallucis brevis muscle, 1 medial lumbrical

Identifiers
- Latin: nervus plantaris medialis
- TA98: A14.2.07.066
- TA2: 6590
- FMA: 44716

The medial plantar nerve (internal plantar nerve) is the larger of the two terminal divisions of the tibial nerve (medial and lateral plantar nerve), which accompanies the medial plantar artery.

From its origin under the laciniate ligament it passes under cover of the abductor hallucis muscle, and, appearing between this muscle and the flexor digitorum brevis, gives off a proper digital plantar nerve and finally divides opposite the bases of the metatarsal bones into three common digital plantar nerves.

== Branches ==
The branches of the medial plantar nerve are: (1) cutaneous, (2) muscular, (3) articular, (4) a proper digital nerve to the medial side of the great toe, and (5) three common digital nerves.

=== Cutaneous branches ===
The cutaneous branches pierce the plantar aponeurosis between the abductor hallucis and the flexor digitorum brevis and are distributed to the skin of the sole of the foot.

=== Muscular branches ===
The muscular branches supply muscles on the medial side of the sole, including the abductor hallucis, the flexor digitorum brevis, the flexor hallucis brevis, and the first lumbrical; those for the abductor hallucis and flexor digitorum brevis arise from the trunk of the nerve near its origin and enter the deep surfaces of the muscles; the branch of the flexor hallucis brevis springs from the proper digital nerve to the medial side of the great toe, and that for the first lumbrical is from the first common digital nerve.

=== Articular branches ===
The articular branches supply the articulations of the tarsus and metatarsus.

=== Proper digital nerve of the great toe ===
The proper digital nerve of the great toe (nn. digitales plantares proprii; plantar digital branches) supplies the flexor hallucis brevis and the skin on the medial side of the great toe.

=== Three common digital nerves ===
The three common digital nerves (nn. digitales plantares communes) pass between the divisions of the plantar aponeurosis, and each splits into two proper digital nerves—those of the first common digital nerve supply the adjacent sides of the great and second toes; those of the second, the adjacent sides of the second and third toes; and those of the third, the adjacent sides of the third and fourth toes.

The third common digital nerve receives a communicating branch from the lateral plantar nerve; the first gives a twig to the first lumbricals.

Each proper digital nerve gives off cutaneous and articular filaments; and opposite the last phalanx sends upward a dorsal branch, which supplies the structures around the nail, the continuation of the nerve being distributed to the ball of the toe.

It will be observed that these digital nerves are similar in their distribution to those of the median nerve in the hand.

== Additional images ==
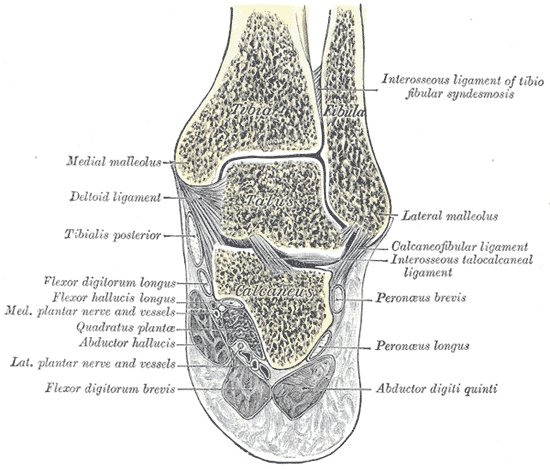
Coronal section through right talocrural and talocalcaneal joints.

Diagram of the segmental distribution of the cutaneous nerves of the sole of the foot.

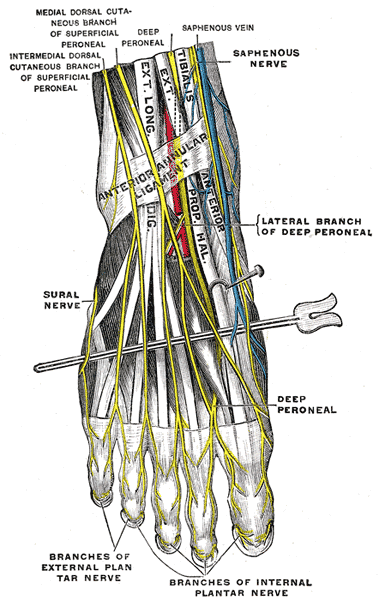
Nerves of the dorsum of the foot.
