= Adductor obliquus =

Adductor obliquus may refer to:

- Adductor hallucis muscle (adductor obliquus hallucis)
- Adductor pollicis muscle (adductor obliquus pollicis)
