= Flexor digitorum muscle =

Flexor digitorum muscle or flexor digitorum communis may refer to:

In the hand:

- Flexor digitorum profundus muscle (flexor digitorum communis profundus)
- Flexor digitorum superficialis muscle (flexor digitorum communis sublimis)

In the foot/leg:

- Flexor digitorum brevis muscle (flexor digitorum communis brevis)
- Flexor digitorum longus muscle (flexor digitorum communis longus)

== See also ==
- Extensor digitorum communis
