= Flexor hallucis muscle =

Flexor hallucis muscle may refer to:

- Flexor hallucis brevis muscle
- Flexor hallucis longus muscle
