= Medial plantar artery =

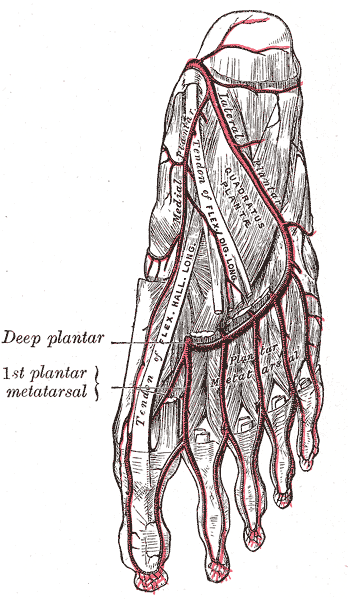
- The plantar arteries. Deep view. (Medial plantar artery visible at upper left.)

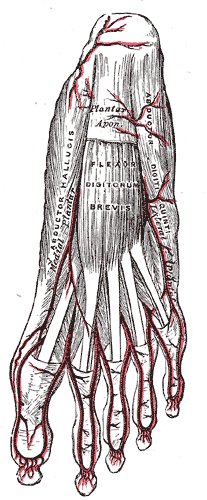
- The plantar arteries. Superficial view. (Medial plantar artery visible at center left.)

Details
- Source: Posterior tibial artery
- Supplies: Sole

Identifiers
- Latin: arteria plantaris medialis
- TA98: A12.2.16.061
- TA2: 4734
- FMA: 43925

The medial plantar artery (internal plantar artery), much smaller than the lateral plantar artery, passes forward along the medial side of the foot.

It is at first situated above the abductor hallucis, and then between it and the flexor digitorum brevis, both of which it supplies.

At the base of the first metatarsal bone, where it is much diminished in size, it passes along the medial border of the first toe, anastomosing with the first dorsal metatarsal artery.

Small superficial digital branches accompany the digital branches of the medial plantar nerve and join the plantar metatarsal arteries of the first three spaces.

== Branches ==
A superficial branch which supplies a plantar digital artery to the medial side of the 1st toe, and a deep branch which assists in supplying blood to the plantar metatarsal arteries.

== Additional images ==
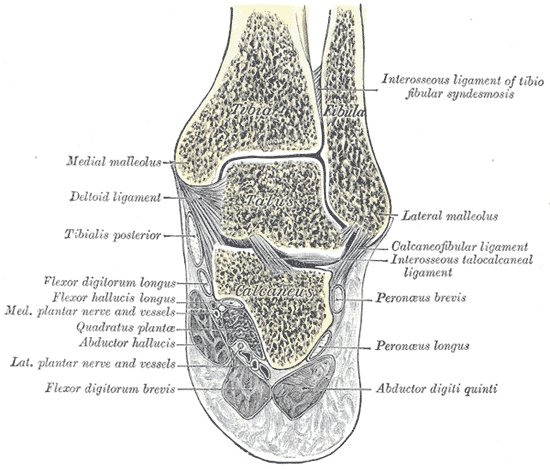
Coronal section through right talocrural and talocalcaneal joints.
