= Deep branch of lateral plantar nerve =

Nerve of the foot

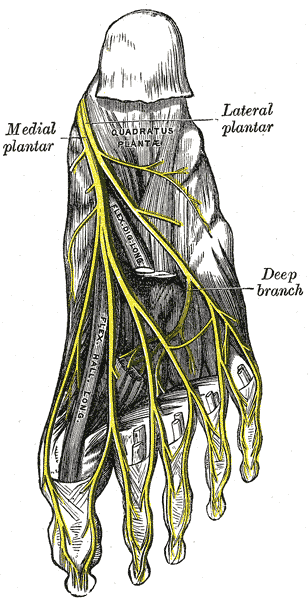
- The plantar nerves.

Details

Identifiers
- Latin: ramus profundus nervi plantaris lateralis
- TA98: A14.2.07.073
- TA2: 6597
- FMA: 44764

The deep branch of lateral plantar nerve (muscular branch) accompanies the lateral plantar artery on the deep surface of the tendons of the Flexor muscles and the Adductor hallucis, and supplies all the Interossei (except those in the fourth metatarsal space), the second, third, and fourth Lumbricales.
