= Superficial branch of lateral plantar nerve =

Group of nerves of the foot

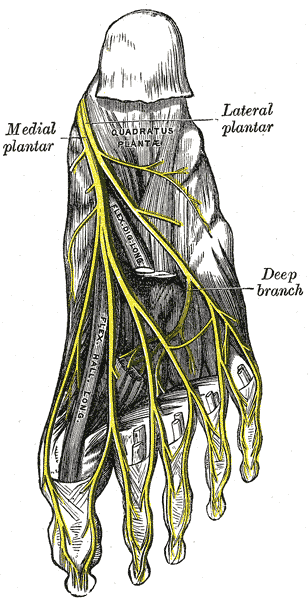
- The plantar nerves.

Details
- From: lateral plantar nerve

Identifiers
- Latin: ramus superficialis nervi plantaris lateralis
- TA98: A14.2.07.070
- TA2: 6594
- FMA: 44763

The superficial branch of the lateral plantar nerve splits into a proper and a common plantar digital nerve:

- the lateral proper plantar digital nerve supplies the lateral side of the 5th digit and a branch for innervation of the Flexor digiti quinti brevis
- the 4th common plantar digital nerve communicates with the third common plantar digital branch of the medial plantar nerve and divides into two proper digital nerves, which supply the adjoining sides of the fourth and fifth toes. The 4th common plantar digital nerve also has a branch that supplies the interosseus muscles of the 4th intermetatarsal space.
