= Lateral plantar nerve =

Branch of the tibial nerve

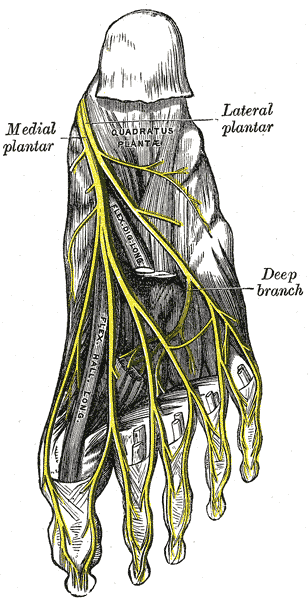
- The plantar nerves.

- Diagram of the segmental distribution of the cutaneous nerves of the sole of the foot.

Details
- From: Tibial nerve
- Innervates: Sole, abductor digiti minimi muscle (foot), flexor digiti minimi brevis muscle (foot), quadratus plantae, 3 lateral lumbricals of the foot, adductor hallucis muscle, plantar interossei muscles, dorsal interossei muscles

Identifiers
- Latin: nervus plantaris lateralis
- TA98: A14.2.07.069
- TA2: 6593
- FMA: 44724

The lateral plantar nerve (external plantar nerve) is a branch of the tibial nerve, in turn a branch of the sciatic nerve and supplies the skin of the fifth toe and lateral half of the fourth, as well as most of the deep muscles, its distribution being similar to that of the ulnar nerve in the hand.

It passes obliquely forward with the lateral plantar artery to the lateral side of the foot, lying between the flexor digitorum brevis and quadratus plantae and, in the interval between the flexor muscle and the abductor digiti minimi, divides into a superficial and a deep branch. Before its division, it supplies the quadratus plantae and abductor digiti minimi. It divides into deep and superficial branches.

== Additional images ==
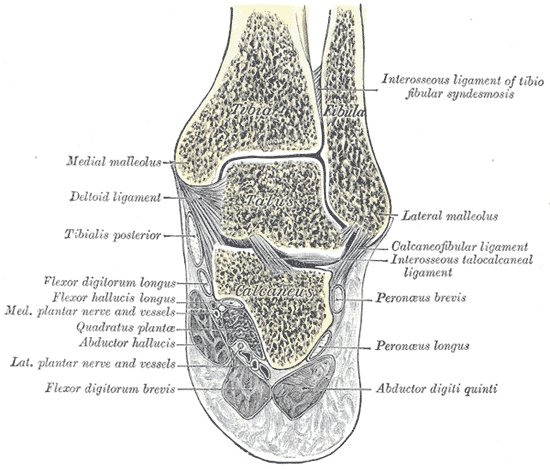
Coronal section through right talocrural and talocalcaneal joints.

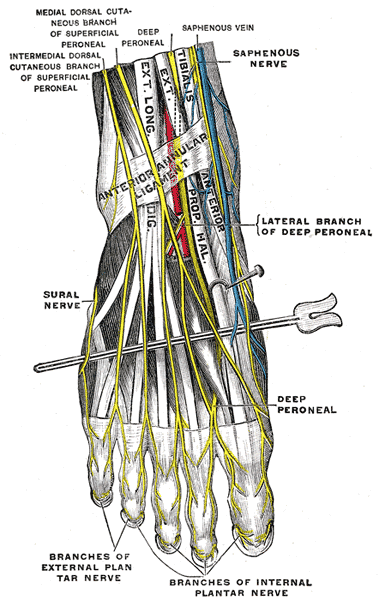
Nerves of the dorsum of the foot.
