= Abductor digiti minimi muscle of foot =

Muscle which lies along the lateral (outer) border of the foot

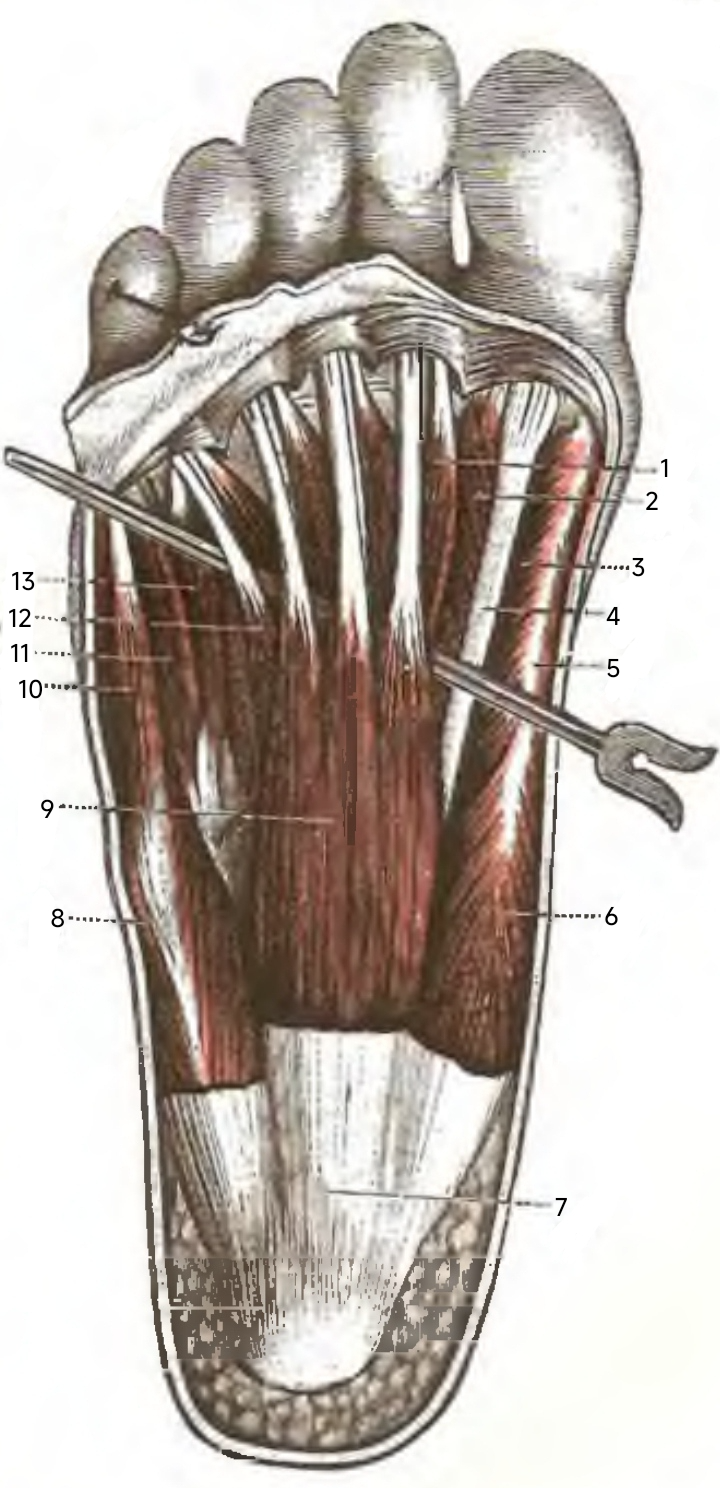
- First layer of the muscles of the sole. Abductor digiti minimi visible at center left and labeled 8, 10. Right foot. (After Testut's Anatomy.)

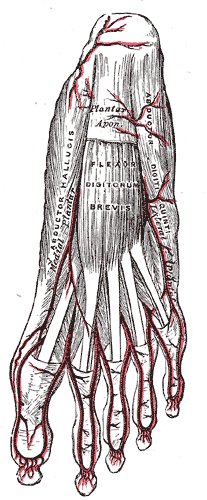
- Superficial view of the plantar arteries (abductor digiti minimi visible at center right).

Details
- Origin: Plantar aponeurosis
- Insertion: Fifth toe or phalanges
- Artery: Lateral plantar artery
- Nerve: Lateral plantar nerve
- Actions: Flexion and abduction of the fifth toe
- Antagonist: Flexor digiti minimi brevis muscle

Identifiers
- Latin: musculus abductor digiti minimi pedis
- TA98: A04.7.02.063
- TA2: 2679
- FMA: 37451

The abductor digiti minimi (abductor minimi digiti, abductor digiti quinti or musculus abductor digiti V.) is a muscle which lies along the lateral (outer) border of the foot, and is in relation by its medial margin with the lateral plantar artery, vein and nerves.

Its homolog in the arm is the abductor digiti minimi muscle in the hand.

== Origin and insertion ==
It arises, by a broad origin, from the lateral process of the tuberosity of the calcaneus, from the under surface of the calcaneus between the two processes of the tuberosity, from the forepart of the medial process, from the plantar aponeurosis, and from the intermuscular septum between it and the flexor digitorum brevis.

Its tendon, after gliding over a smooth facet on the under surface of the base of the fifth metatarsal bone, is inserted, with the flexor digiti quinti brevis, into the fibular side of the base of the first phalanx of the fifth toe.

== Innervation ==
The abductor digiti minimi is innervated by the lateral plantar nerve, a branch of the tibial nerve.

== Function ==
Its function is flexion and abduction of the fifth (little) toe at the metatarsophalangeal joint.

== Clinical relevance ==
Due to its role in posture during all physical activity while in an upright position, the abductor digiti minimi is often the target of injury.

In case of polydactyly it may insert to the sixth toe instead, if there is one.

== Etymology ==
The Latin name abductor digiti minimi translates to abductor of the small digit while the alternative name abductor digiti quinti means abductor of fifth digit.

== Additional images ==
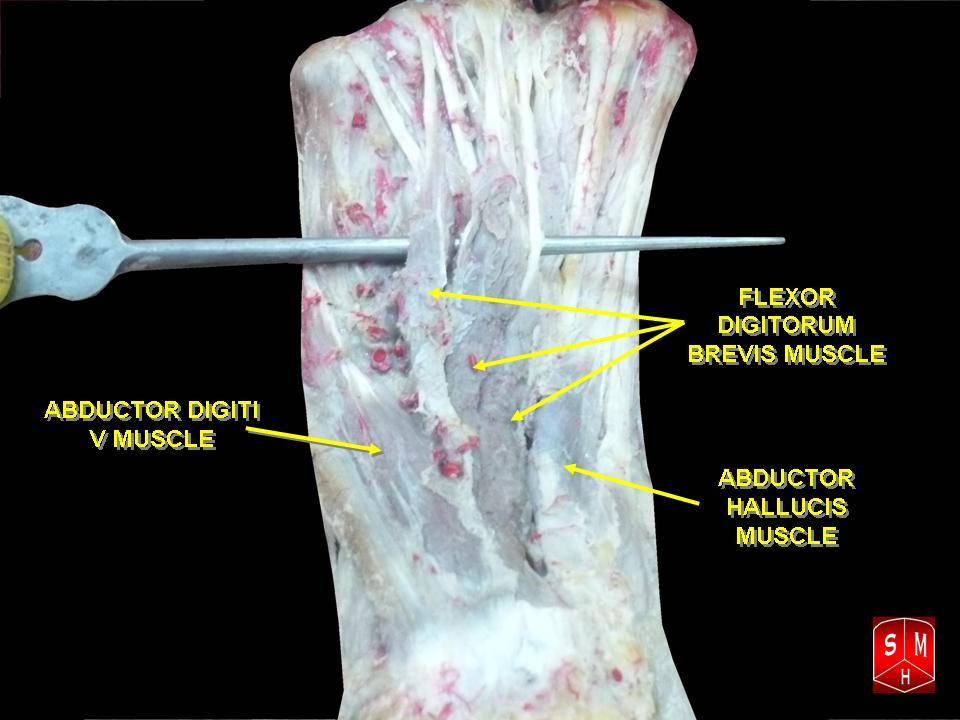
Human cadaver dissection of the muscles in the foot seen from below.

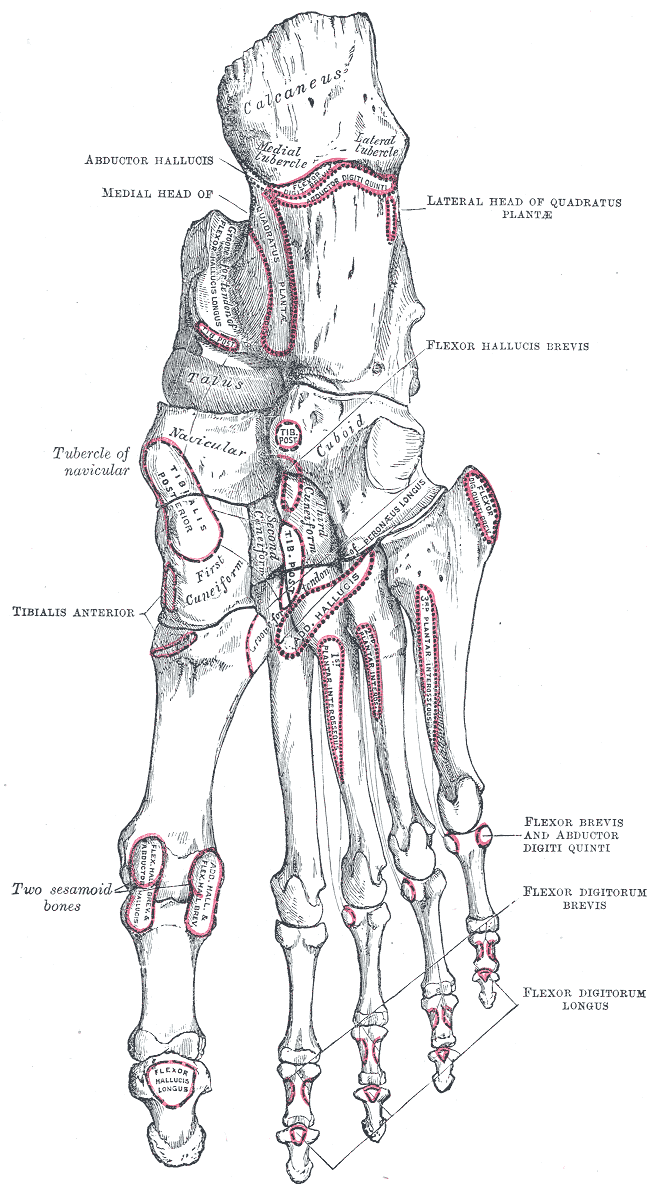
Bones of the right foot seen from below.

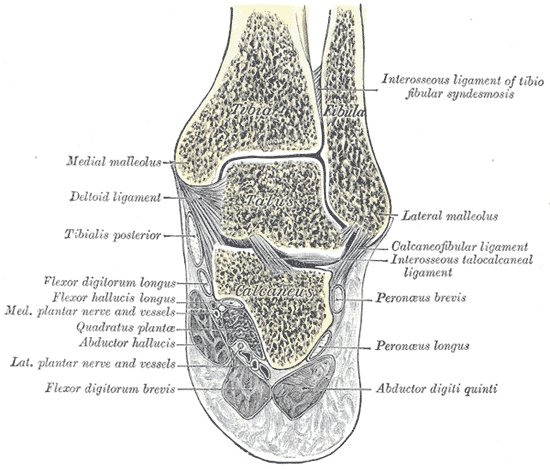
Coronal section through right talocrural and talocalcaneal joints.
