= Flexor retinaculum of the foot =

Strong fibrous band in the foot

Details
- From: Tibial malleolus
- To: Margin of the calcaneus

Identifiers
- Latin: retinaculum musculorum flexorum pedis, ligamentum laciniatum
- TA98: A04.7.03.026
- TA2: 2714
- FMA: 49372

The flexor retinaculum of the foot (laciniate ligament, internal annular ligament) is a strong fibrous band in the foot.

== Structure ==
The flexor retinaculum of the foot extends from the medial malleolus above, to the calcaneus below. This converts a series of bony grooves into canals for the passage of the tendons of the flexor muscles and the posterior tibial vessels and tibial nerve into the sole of the foot, known as the tarsal tunnel.

It is continuous by its upper border with the deep fascia of the leg, and by its lower border with the plantar aponeurosis and the fibers of origin of the abductor hallucis muscle.

Enumerated from the medial side, the four canals which it forms transmit the tendons of the tibialis posterior and flexor digitorum longus muscles; the posterior tibial artery and tibial nerve, which run through a broad space beneath the ligament; and lastly, in a canal formed partly by the talus, the tendon of the flexor hallucis longus.

== Clinical significance ==
Tarsal tunnel syndrome can be caused by entrapment of the tibial nerve beneath the flexor retinaculum of the foot. This is characterized by pain, numbness, and tingling of the medial plantar surface of the foot. This is made worse by standing and walking, and often worse at night. Tinel's sign can be elicited by tapping the part of the flexor retinaculum of the foot over the tibial nerve.
