= Abductor hallucis muscle =

Intrinsic muscle of the foot

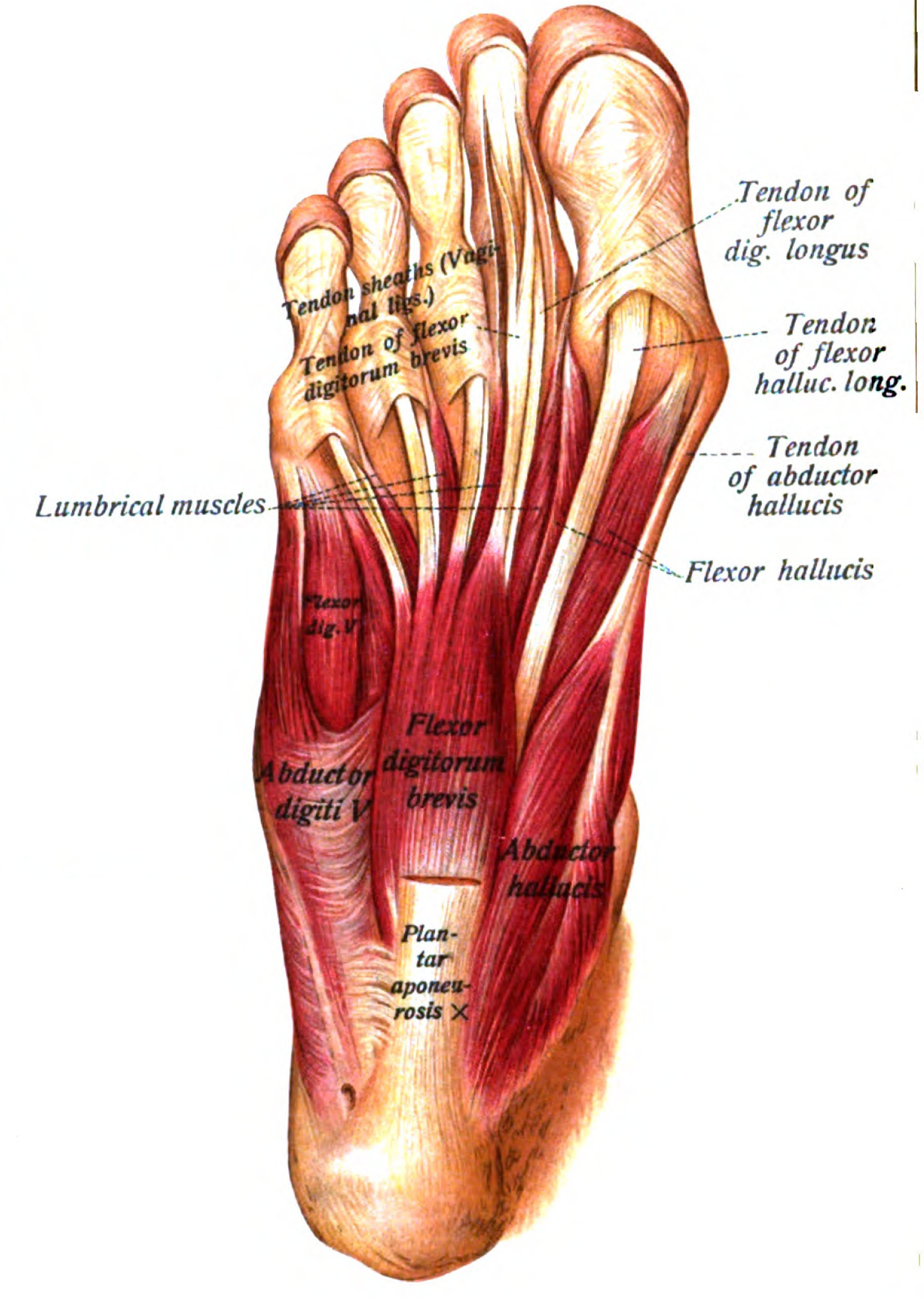
- First layer of muscles of the sole of the foot (abductor hallucis visible at lower right)

Details
- Origin: Medial process of calcaneal tuberosity, Plantar aponeurosis, Flexor retinaculum
- Insertion: Medial aspect of base of 1st phalanx of hallux
- Artery: Medial plantar artery
- Nerve: Medial plantar nerve
- Actions: Abducts hallux
- Antagonist: Adductor hallucis muscle

Identifiers
- Latin: musculus abductor hallucis
- TA98: A04.7.02.056
- TA2: 2672
- FMA: 37448

The abductor hallucis muscle is an intrinsic muscle of the foot. It participates in the abduction and flexion of the great toe.

== Structure ==
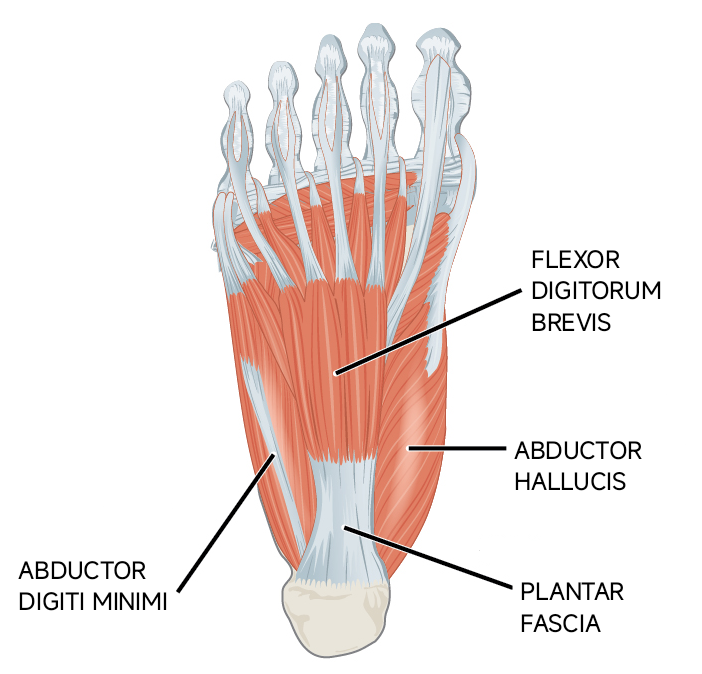
The abductor hallucis as seen from an inferior projection of the foot. This diagram shows the bottom-most layer of muscles, just under the plantar skin of the foot.

The abductor hallucis muscle is located in the medial border of the foot and contributes to form the prominence that is observed on the region. It is inserted behind on the tuberosity of the calcaneus, the flexor retinaculum, and the plantar aponeurosis. Its muscle body, relatively thick behind, flattens as it goes forward. It ends in a common tendon with the medial head of the flexor hallucis brevis that inserts on the medial surface of the base of the first proximal phalanx and its related sesamoid bone. Its medial surface is superficial and covered with the muscle's fascia and the skin.

=== Nerve supply ===
Abductor hallucis is supplied by the medial plantar nerve. The nerves that supply it enter the muscle from its upper border.

== Additional images ==
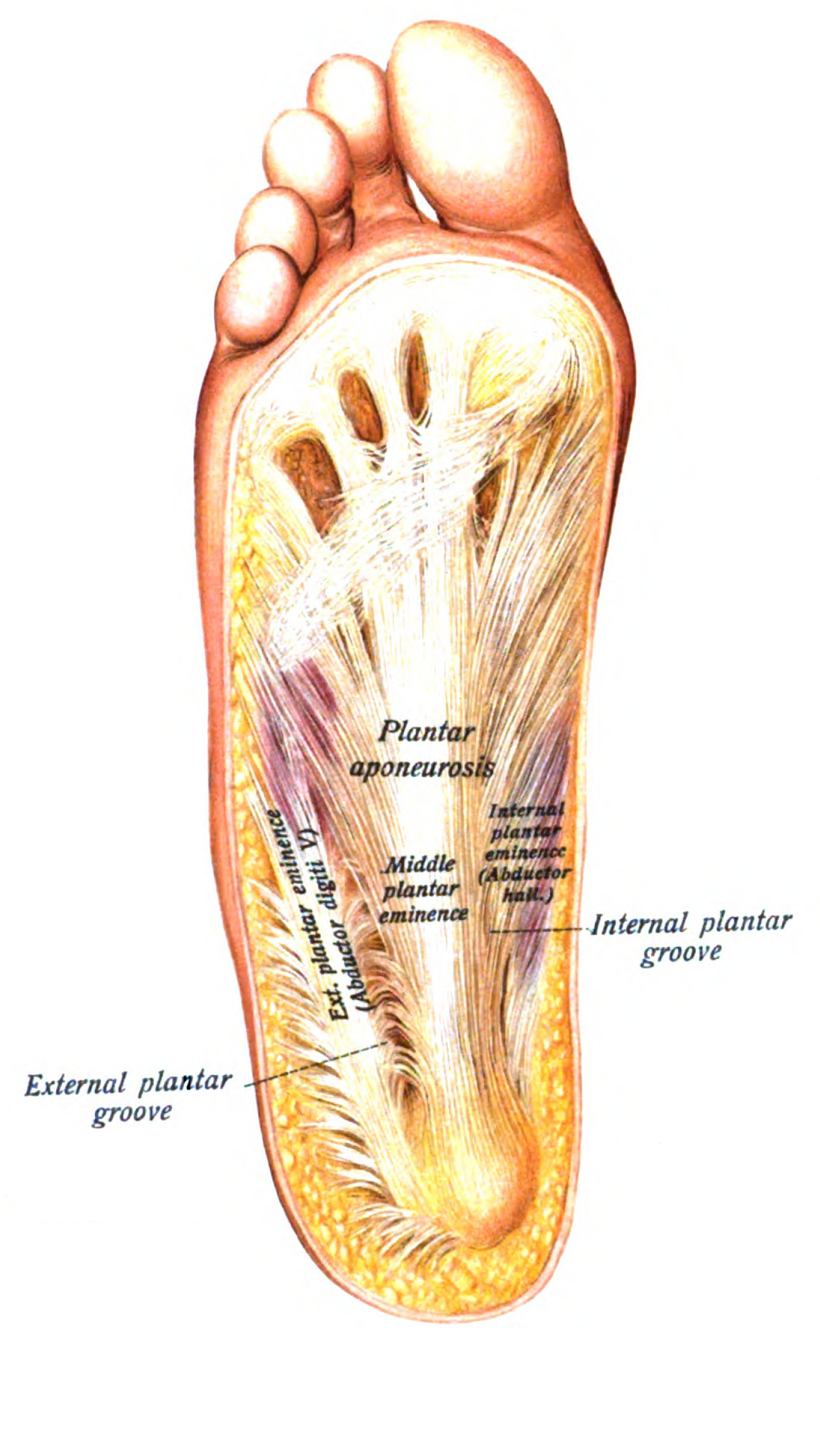
Superficial dissection of the sole of the foot, showing the medial eminence formed by abductor hallucis

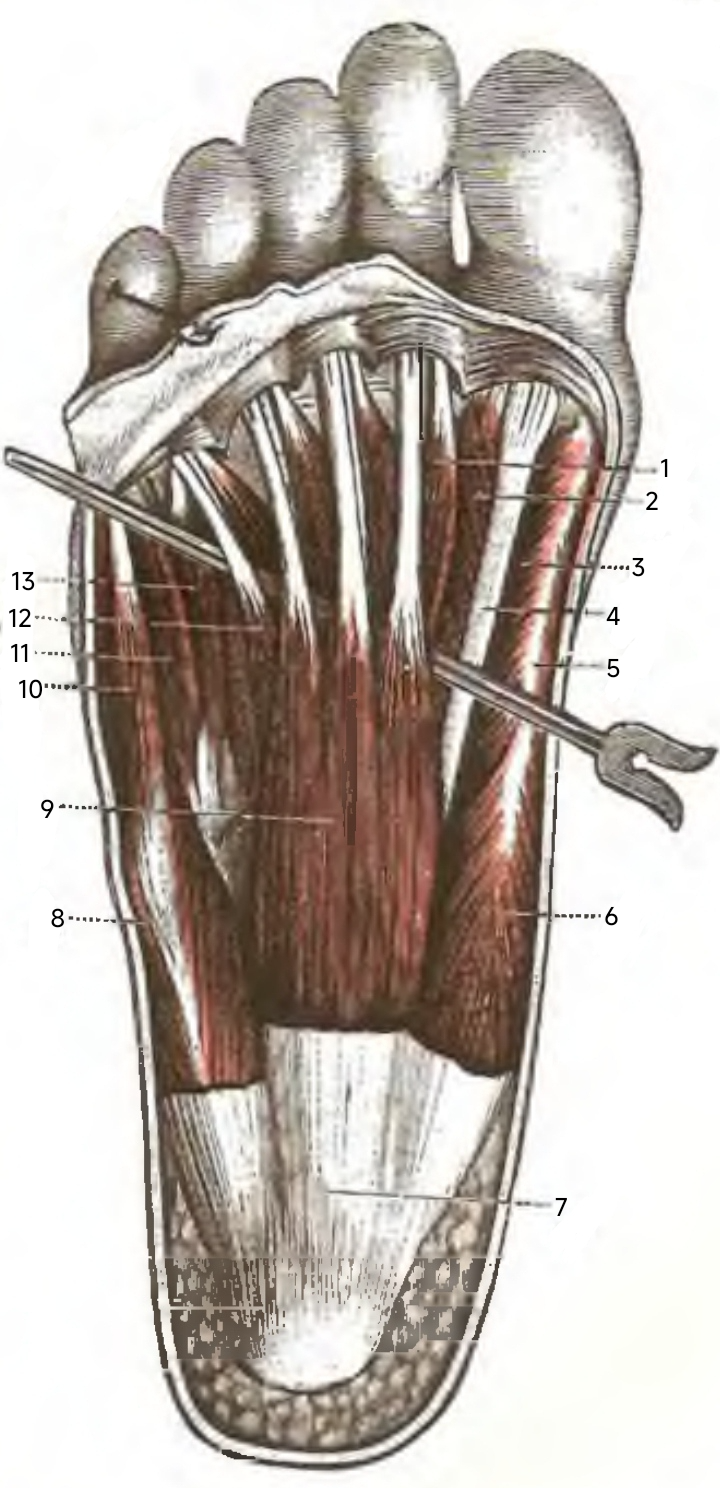
Muscles of the sole of the right foot. First layer. Abductor hallucis is labeled 5 and 6 at center right. (After Testut's Anatomy.)

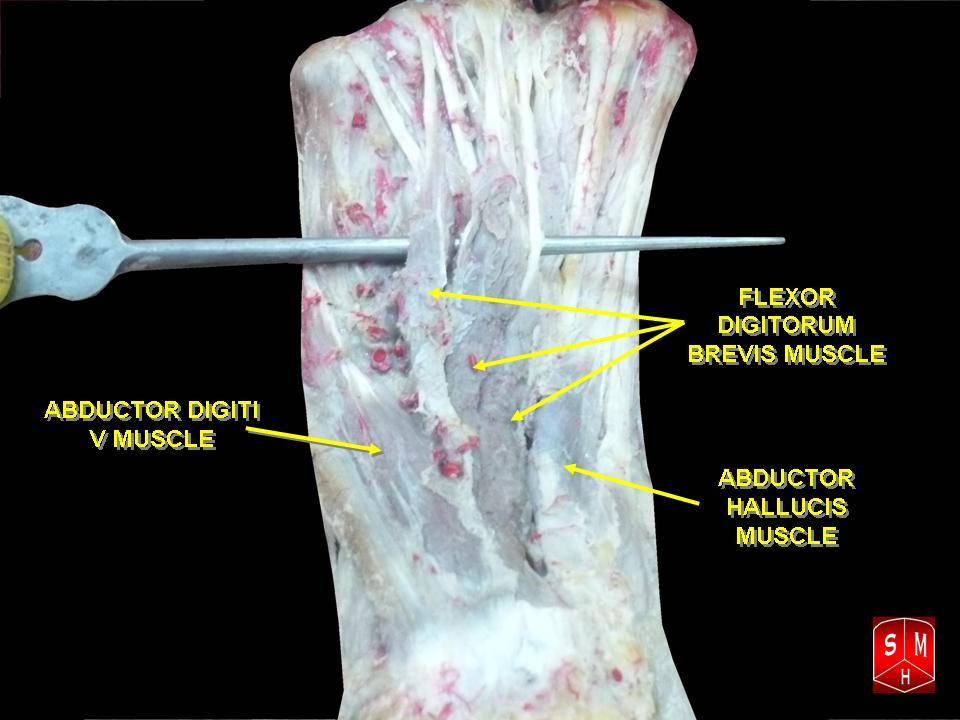
Abductor hallucis muscle

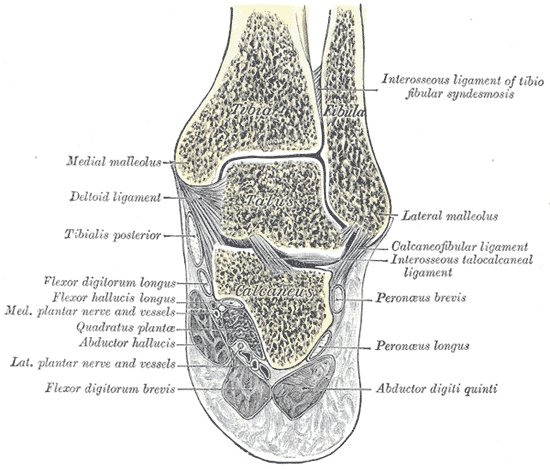
Coronal section through right talocrural and talocalcaneal joints

== See also ==
- Intrinsic muscles of the foot
- Sole of the foot
