= Lumbricals of the foot =

Four small skeletal muscles

Lumbrical muscle of the foot
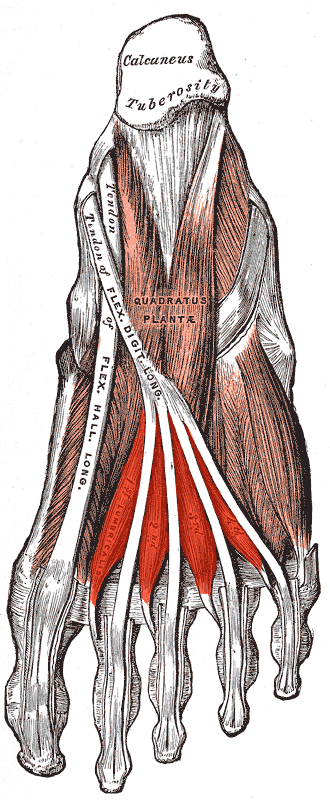
- Muscles of the sole of the right foot, viewed from below. Second layer. (Lumbricals visible at bottom.)

Details
- Origin: Medial borders of long flexor tendons
- Insertion: Proximal phalanges and extensor tendons of the 4 lateral toes
- Artery: Medial and lateral plantar arteries
- Nerve: Medial and lateral plantar nerves (S3)
- Actions: Flexes metatarsophalangeal joints, extends interphalangeal joints

Identifiers
- Latin: musculus lumbricalis pedis
- TA98: A04.7.02.069
- TA2: 2685
- FMA: 37453

The lumbricals are four small skeletal muscles, accessory to the tendons of the flexor digitorum longus muscle. They are numbered from the medial side of the foot.

== Structure ==
The lumbricals arise from the tendons of the flexor digitorum longus muscle, as far back as their angles of division, each springing from two tendons, except the first. The first lumbrical is unipennate, while the second, third and fourth are bipennate.

The muscles end in tendons, which pass forward on the medial sides of the four lesser toes, and are inserted into the expansions of the tendons of the extensor digitorum longus muscle on the dorsal surfaces of the proximal phalanges. All four lumbricals insert into extensor hoods of the phalanges, thus creating extension at the inter-phalangeal (PIP and DIP) joints. However, as the tendons also pass inferior to the metatarsal phalangeal (MTP) joints it creates flexion at this joint.

=== Innervation ===
The most medial lumbrical is innervated by the medial plantar nerve while the remaining three lumbricals are supplied by the lateral plantar nerve.

=== Variation ===
Absence of one or more; doubling of the third or fourth even the fifth. Insertion partly or wholly into the first phalanges.

== History ==
The term "lumbrical" comes from the Latin, meaning "worm".

== Additional images ==
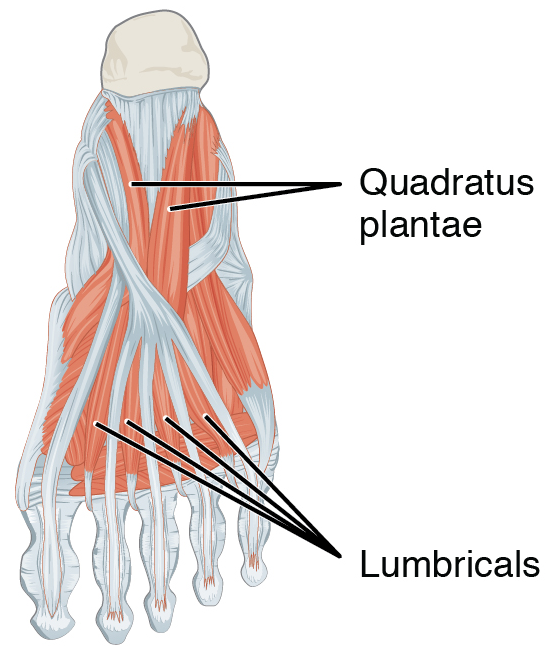
The lumbricals of the foot flex the metatarsophalangeal joints and extend the interphalangeal joints.
