= Flexor hallucis brevis muscle =

Muscle in sole of the foot that leads to the big toe

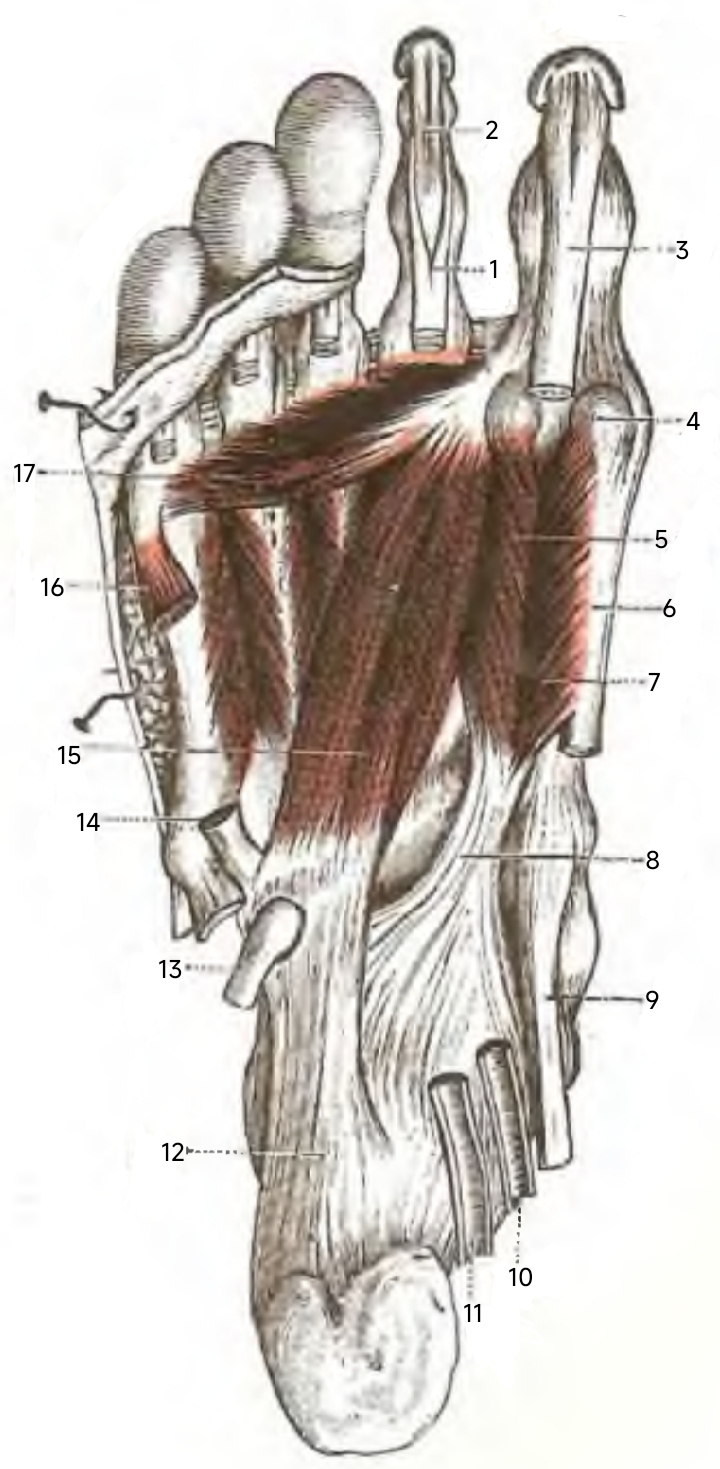
- Muscles of the sole of the right foot. Third layer. Flexor hallucis brevis is labeled 4, 5, 7 & 8 at right. (After Testut's Anatomy.)

Details
- Origin: Plantar aspect of the cuneiforms, plantar calcaneocuboid ligament, long plantar ligament
- Insertion: Medial Head: Medial sesamoid bone of the metatarsophalangeal joint, proximal phalanx of great toe. Lateral head: Lateral sesamoid bone of the metatarsophalangeal joint, proximal phalanx of great toe
- Nerve: Medial plantar nerve
- Actions: Flex hallux
- Antagonist: Extensor hallucis longus muscle

Identifiers
- Latin: musculus flexor hallucis brevis
- TA98: A04.7.02.057
- TA2: 2673
- FMA: 37449

Flexor hallucis brevis muscle is a muscle of the foot that flexes the big toe.

== Structure ==
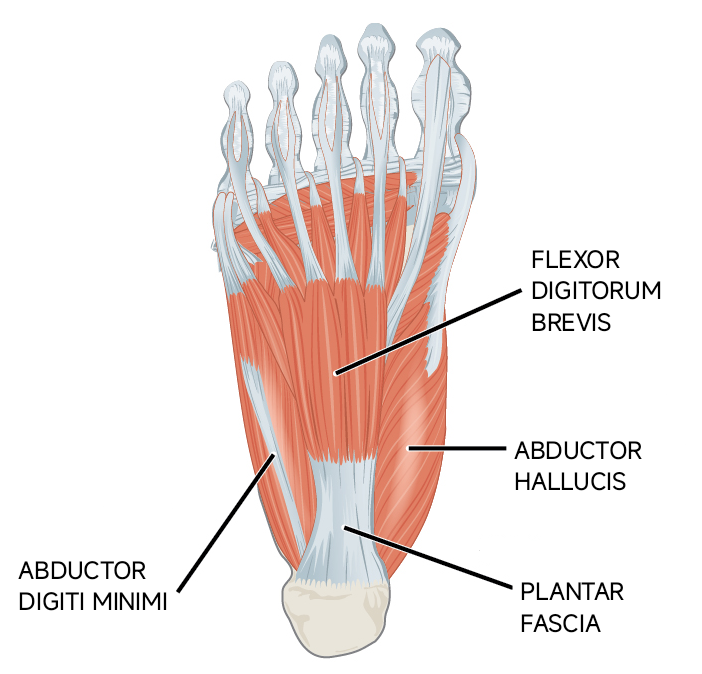
The flexor hallucis brevis is located just inferior to the foot and toe bones. As its name suggests, its contraction results in flexion of the big toe (hallux).

Flexor hallucis brevis muscle arises, by a pointed tendinous process, from the medial part of the under surface of the cuboid bone, from the contiguous portion of the third cuneiform, and from the prolongation of the tendon of the tibialis posterior muscle which is attached to that bone. It divides in front into two portions, which are inserted into the medial and lateral sides of the base of the first phalanx of the great toe, a sesamoid bone being present in each tendon at its insertion. The medial portion is blended with the abductor hallucis muscle previous to its insertion; the lateral portion (sometimes described as the first plantar interosseus) with the adductor hallucis muscle. The tendon of the flexor hallucis longus muscle lies in a groove between the two. Its tendon usually contains two sesamoid bones at the point under the first metatarsophalangeal joint.

=== Innervation ===
The medial and lateral head of the flexor hallucis brevis is innervated by the medial plantar nerve. Both heads are represented by spinal segments S1, S2.

=== Variation ===
Origin subject to considerable variation; it often receives fibers from the calcaneus or long plantar ligament. Attachment to the cuboid bone sometimes wanting. Slip to first phalanx of the second toe.

== Function ==
Flexor hallucis brevis flexes the first metatarsophalangeal joint, or the big toe. It helps to maintain the medial longitudinal arch. It assists with the toe-off phase of gait providing increased push-off.

== Clinical significance ==
Both sesamoid bones contained within the tendon of flexor hallucis brevis muscle may become damaged during exercise.

== Additional images ==
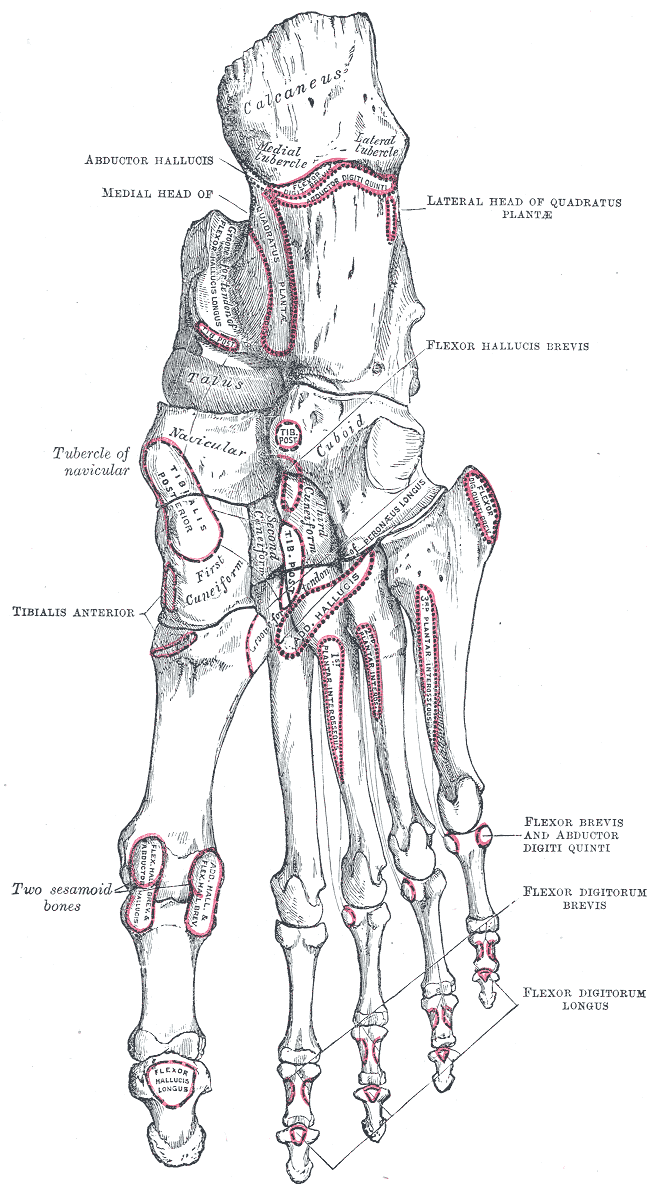
Bones of the right foot. Plantar surface.

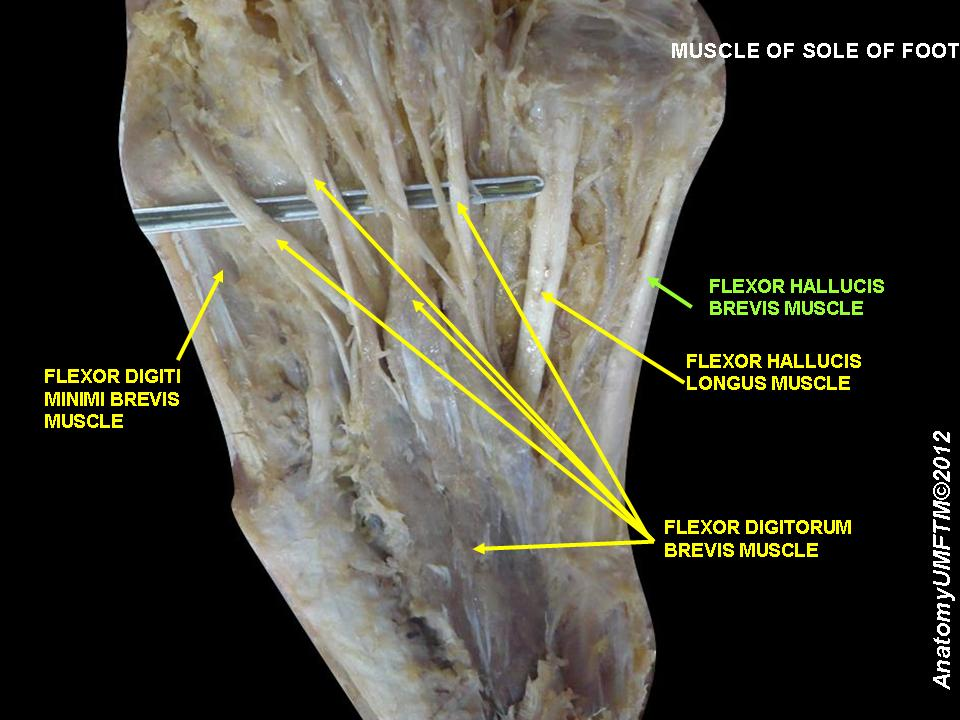
Flexor hallucis brevis muscle

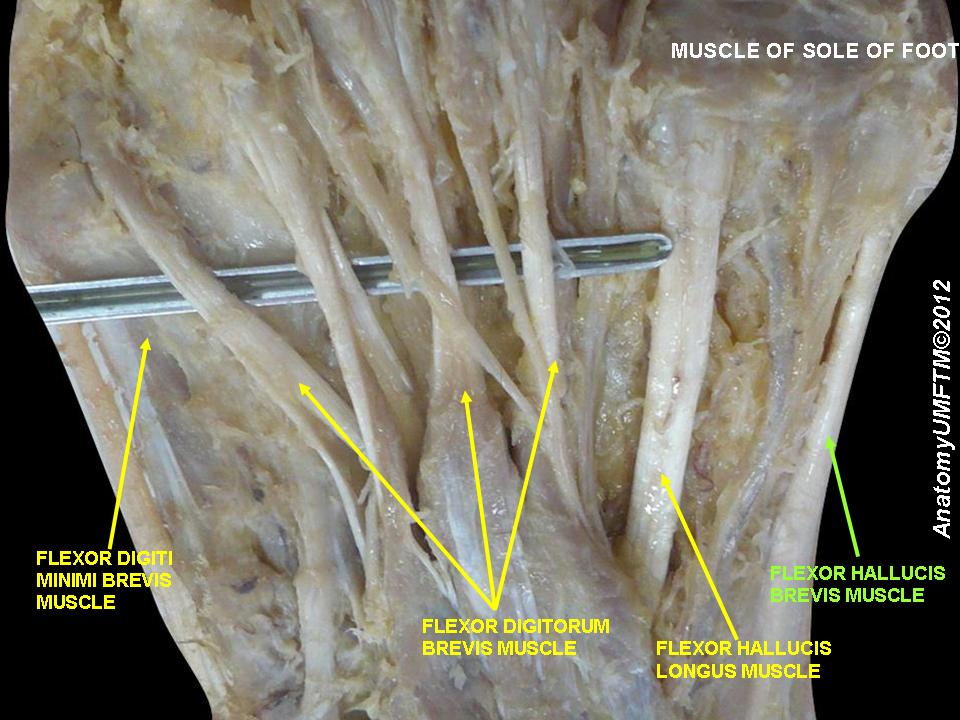
Flexor hallucis brevis muscle
