= Adductor hallucis muscle =

Muscle responsible for adducting the big toe

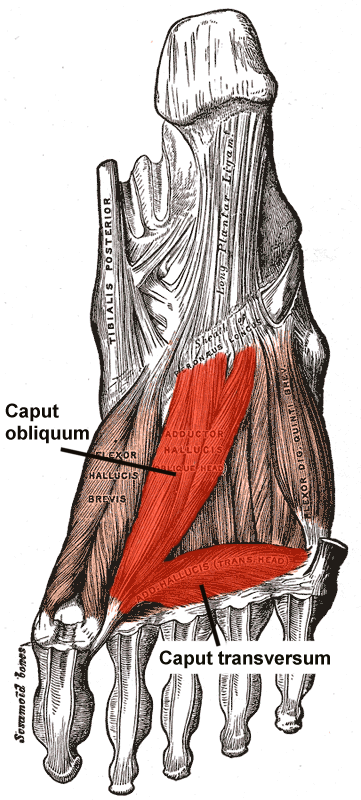
- Muscles of the sole of the foot. Third layer. (Oblique head visible at center, and transverse head visible at bottom.

Details
- Origin: Oblique head: proximal ends of middle 3 metatarsal bones; Transverse head: MTP ligaments of lateral 3 toes
- Insertion: Lateral side of base of first phalanx of the 1st toe; sesamoid apparatus
- Artery: Lateral plantar artery
- Nerve: Lateral plantar nerve
- Actions: Adducts hallux
- Antagonist: Abductor hallucis muscle

Identifiers
- Latin: musculus adductor hallucis
- TA98: A04.7.02.060
- TA2: 2676
- FMA: 37454

The Adductor hallucis (adductor obliquus hallucis) arises by two heads—oblique and transverse and is responsible for adducting the big toe. It has two heads, both are innervated by the lateral plantar nerve.

== Structure ==
=== Oblique head ===
The oblique head is a large, thick, fleshy mass, crossing the foot obliquely and occupying the hollow space under the first, second, third and fourth metatarsal bones. It arises from the bases of the second, third, and fourth metatarsal bones, and from the sheath of the tendon of the Peroneus longus, and is inserted, together with the lateral portion of the flexor hallucis brevis, into the lateral side of the base of the first phalanx of the great toe.

=== Transverse head ===
The transverse head (Transversus pedis) is a narrow, flat fasciculus which arises from the plantar metatarsophalangeal ligaments of the third, fourth, and fifth toes (sometimes only from the third and fourth), and from the transverse ligament of the metatarsals.

It is inserted into the lateral side of the base of the first phalanx of the great toe, its fibers blending with the tendon of insertion of the oblique head.

=== Variation ===
Slips to the base of the first phalanx of the second toe. Opponens hallucis, occasional slips from the adductor to the metatarsal bone of the great toe.

== Additional images ==
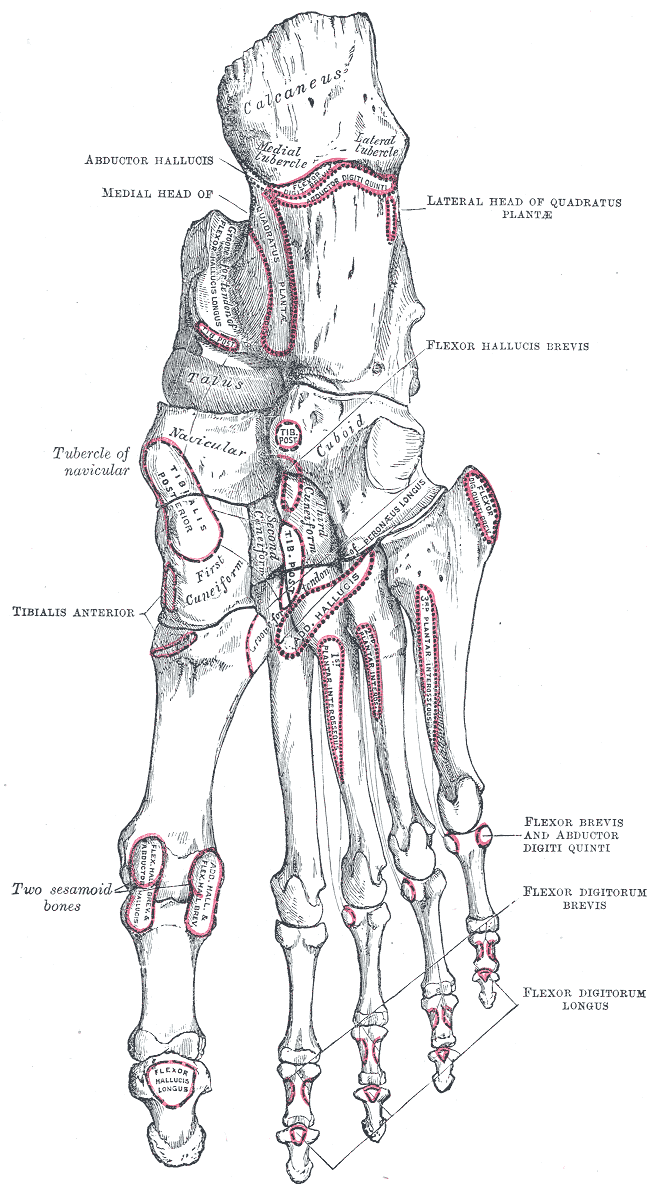
Bones of the right foot. Plantar surface.

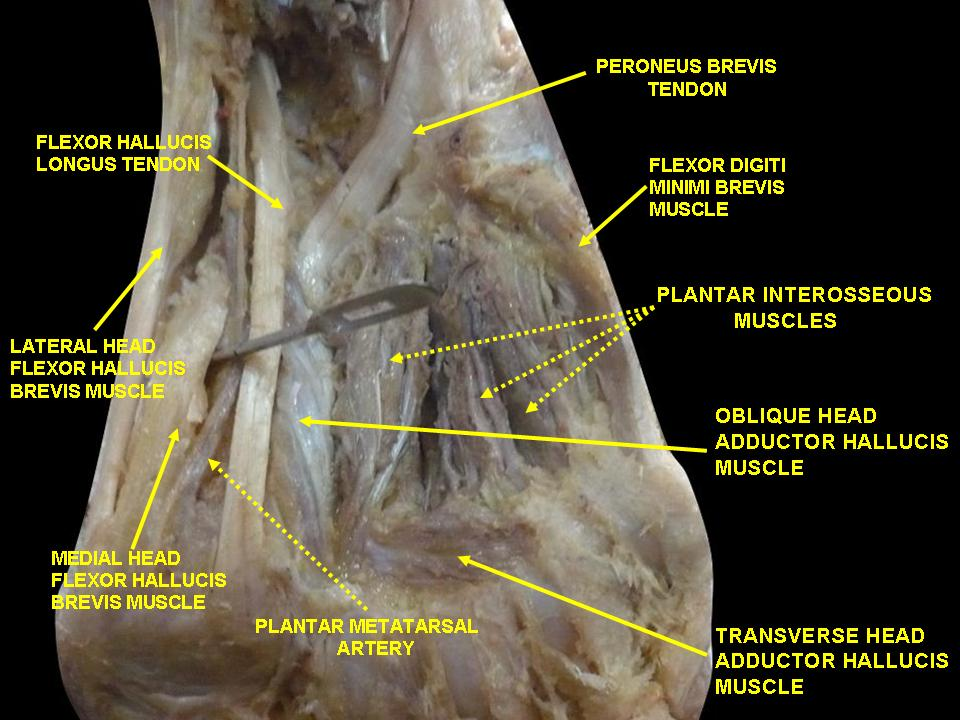
Muscles of the sole of the foot.
