= Retinaculum (disambiguation) =

Retinaculum may refer to:

In vertebrate anatomy:

- Retinaculum, a band around tendons that holds them in place
- Extensor retinaculum of the hand
- Flexor retinaculum of the hand
- Flexor retinaculum of foot
- Inferior extensor retinaculum of foot
- Lateral retinaculum
- Medial patellar retinaculum
- Peroneal retinacula
- Retinaculum cutis mammae, Latin name for connective breast tissue
- Superior extensor retinaculum of foot

In invertebrate anatomy:

- the retinaculum, in wing
- the Retinaculum (springtail), in springtail abdomen
- Buffetia retinaculum, a species of air-breathing land snail
