= Crural ligament =

Crural ligament may refer to:

- Transverse crural ligament
- Cruciate crural ligament
