= Extensor retinaculum of foot =

Extensor retinaculum of foot may refer to

- Inferior extensor retinaculum of foot
- Superior extensor retinaculum of foot
