= Extensor longus muscle =

Extensor longus muscle may refer to:

- Extensor digitorum longus muscle
- Extensor hallucis longus muscle
- Extensor pollicis longus muscle
