= Retinaculum =

Band of thickened deep fascia around tendons that holds them in place

A retinaculum (pl.: retinacula) is a band of thickened deep fascia around tendons that holds them in place. It is not part of any muscle and primarily functions to stabilize tendons. The term retinaculum is Neo-Latin, derived from the Latin verb retinere (to retain). Specific retinacula include:

- In the wrist:
  - Flexor retinaculum of the hand
  - Extensor retinaculum of the hand
- In the ankle:
  - Flexor retinaculum of foot
  - Superior extensor retinaculum of foot
  - Inferior extensor retinaculum of foot
  - Superior fibular retinaculum
  - Inferior fibular retinaculum
- In the knee:
  - Lateral retinaculum
  - Medial patellar retinaculum
