= Retinaculum of foot =

Retinaculum of foot may refer to

- Flexor retinaculum of foot
- Peroneal retinacula
- Superior extensor retinaculum of foot
- Inferior extensor retinaculum of foot
