= Digitorum longus muscle =

Digitorum longus muscle may refer to:

- Extensor digitorum longus muscle
- Flexor digitorum longus muscle
