= Extensor hallucis longus muscle =

Thin muscle, situated between the tibialis anterior and the extensor digitorum longus

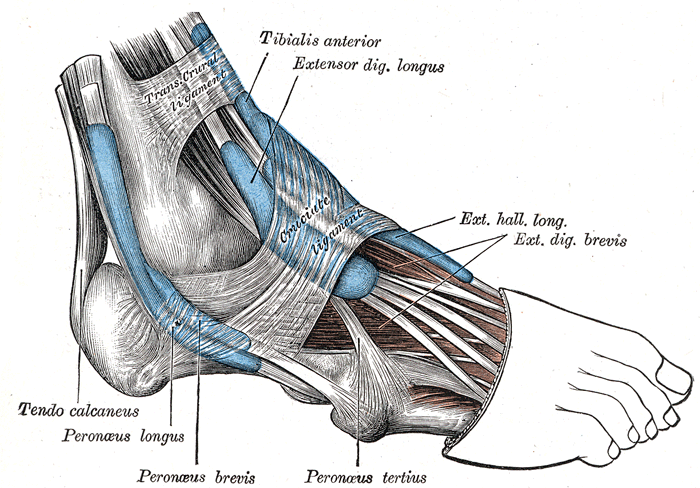
- The mucous sheaths of the tendons around the ankle. Lateral aspect. (Ext. hall. long. labeled at upper left.)

- Animation

Details
- Origin: Arises from the middle portion of the fibula on the anterior surface and the interosseous membrane
- Insertion: Inserts on the dorsal side of the base of the distal phalanx of the big toe
- Artery: Anterior tibial artery
- Nerve: Deep fibular nerve, L5 (L4-S1)
- Actions: Extends (raises) the big toe and assists in dorsiflexion of the foot at the ankle. Also is a weak evertor/invertor
- Antagonist: Flexor hallucis longus, flexor hallucis brevis

Identifiers
- Latin: musculus extensor hallucis longus
- TA98: A04.7.02.040
- TA2: 2650
- FMA: 22533

The extensor hallucis longus muscle is a thin skeletal muscle, situated between the tibialis anterior and the extensor digitorum longus. It extends the big toe and causes dorsiflexion of the foot. It also assists with foot eversion and inversion.

== Structure ==
The muscle ends as a tendon of insertion. The tendon passes through a distinct compartment in the inferior extensor retinaculum of foot. It crosses anterior tibial vessels lateromedially near the bend of the ankle. In the foot, its tendon is situated at along the medial side of the dorsum of the foot. Opposite the metatarsophalangeal articulation, the tendon gives off a thin prolongation on either side, to cover the surface of the joint. An expansion from the medial side of the tendon is usually inserted into the base of the proximal phalanx.

=== Origin ===
The extensor hallucis longus muscle arises from the middle portion of the anterior surface of the fibula and adjacent interosseous membrane of the leg. Its origin is medial to the origin of the extensor digitorum longus muscle.

=== Insertion ===
The muscle inserts at the base of the distal phalanx of the great toe.

=== Nerve supply ===
The muscle receives motor innervation from the deep fibular nerve (L5) (a branch of common fibular nerve).

=== Relations ===
The anterior tibial vessels and deep fibular nerve pass between this muscle and the tibialis anterior muscle.

=== Variation ===
Occasionally united at its origin with the extensor digitorum longus.

The extensor ossis metatarsi hallucis, a small muscle, sometimes found as a slip from the extensor hallucis longus, or from the tibialis anterior, or from the extensor digitorum longus, or as a distinct muscle; it traverses the same compartment of the transverse ligament with the extensor hallucis longus.

=== Actions/movements ===
The muscle extends the big toe (primary action), and causes dorsiflexion of the foot (secondary action).

== Additional images ==
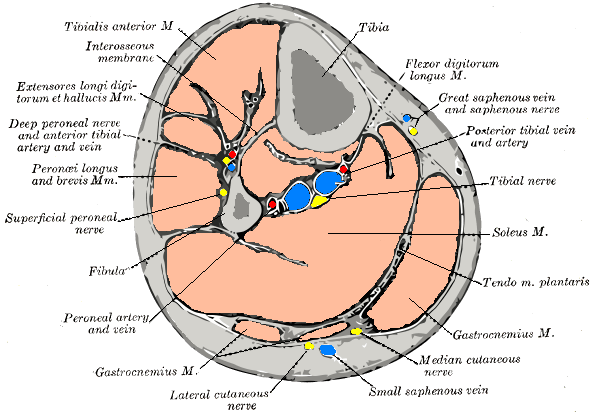
Cross-section through middle of leg. (Extensores longi digitorum et hallucis labeled at upper left.)

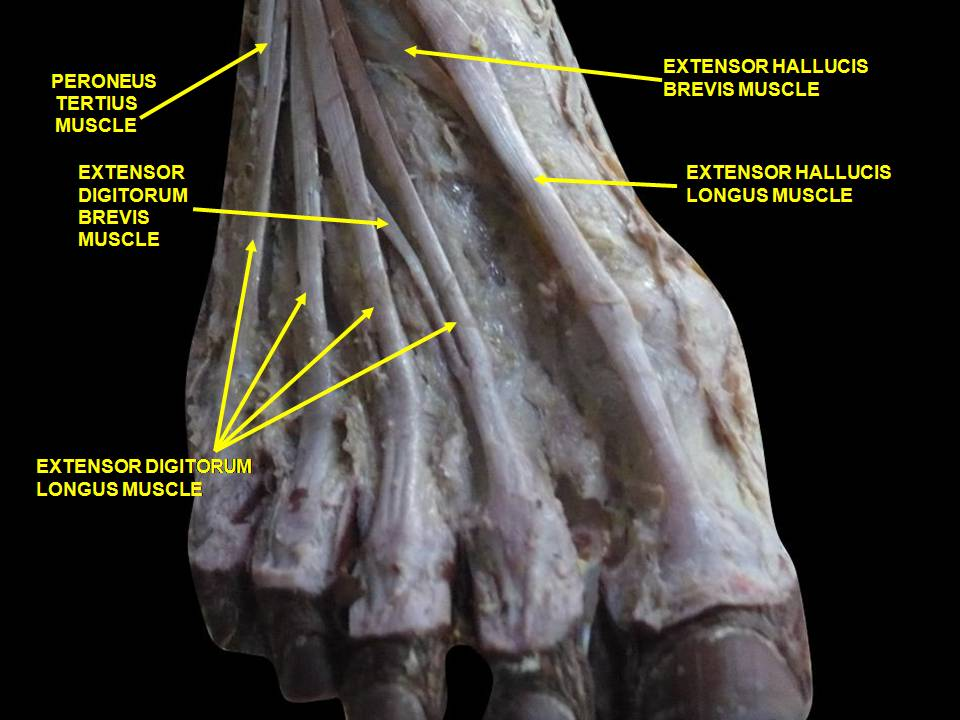
Dorsum of Foot. Deep dissection.

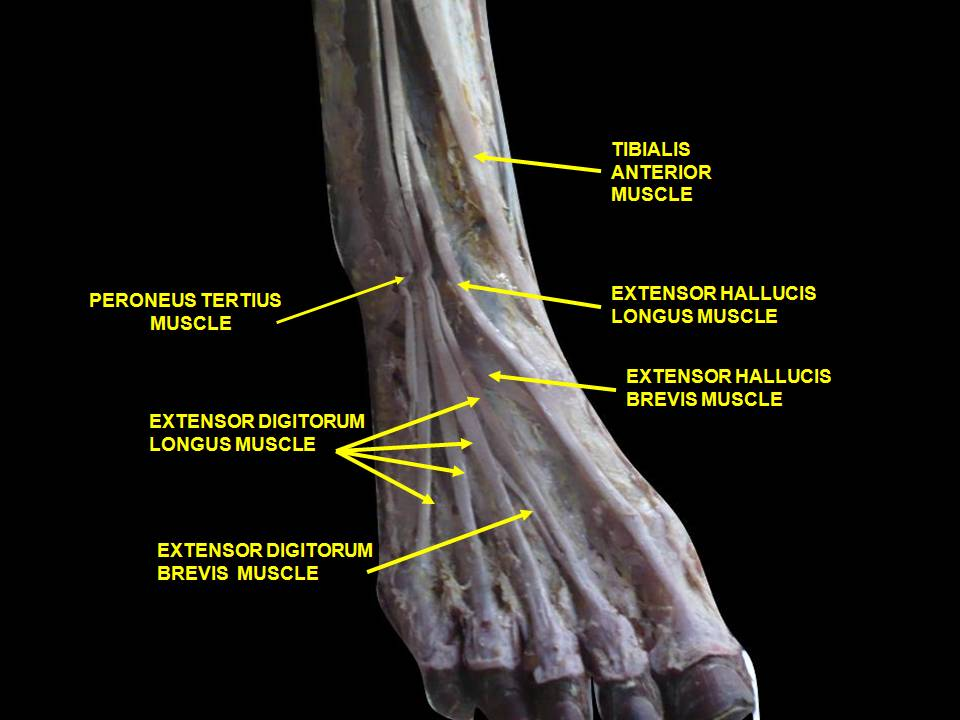
Dorsum of Foot. Deep dissection.

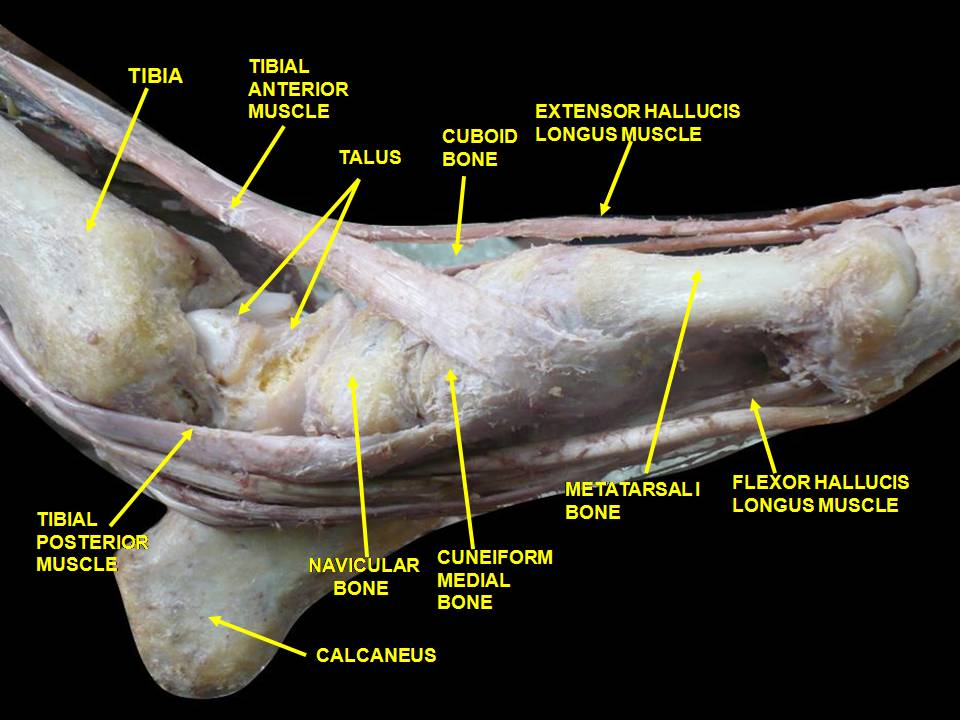
Ankle joint. Deep dissection. Medial view

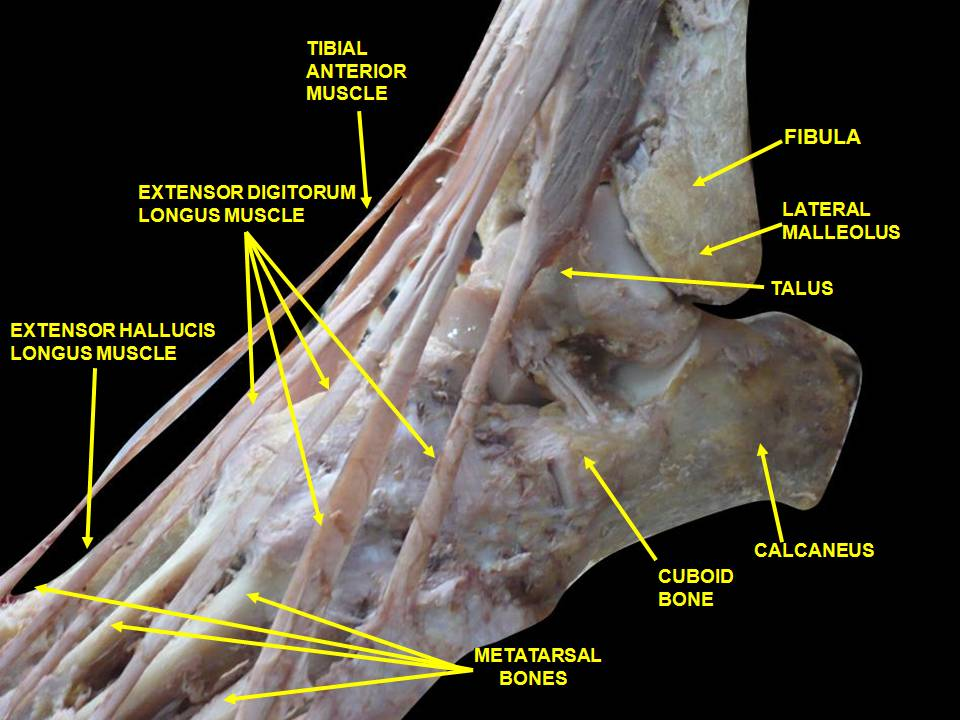
Ankle joint. Deep dissection. Lateral view.
