= Hecht Scott syndrome =

- Other names: Fibular aplasia–tibial campomelia–oligosyndactyly (FATCO) syndrome
- Diagnostic method: Radiographs, physical examination
- Management: Orthoses, Limb lengthening, Epiphysiodesis, Early amputations, Prosthesis
- Frequency: 0.0001%

Hecht Scott syndrome (also known as fibular aplasia–tibial campomelia–oligosyndactyly [FATCO] syndrome) is a rare genetic disease that causes congenital limb formation. The main characterisation is the aplasia or hypoplasia of bones (mainly the fibula or tibia) of the limb. It is currently presenting in less than 1 in 1,000,000 newborns. It has been known to be more commonly present in males. It was first diagnosed in 2005 by Courtens et al. who recognised the malformations with his present case and four others that were similarly described in literature.

== Signs and symptoms ==
Hecht Scott syndrome effects the tibia and fibula. Common physical symptoms show a short leg, the ankle and foot being short and deformed, absence of rays and bowing of the tibia. Another physical symptom is the presence of contralateral oligosyndactyly of the hand. Hecht Scott syndrome is also associated with psychosocial morbidity and mortality. Therefore, early diagnosis and treatment of this syndrome is vital. Prenatal screening can reveal whether the child will have Hecht Scott syndrome by observing skeletal abnormalities.

== Genetics ==
WNT7A is a gene that is a member of the WNT family. The WNT family consists of structurally related genes. Mutations in WNT7A causes a range of diseases associated with limb malformations. Such diseases include Fuhrmann syndrome and Al-Awadi/Raas-Rothschild/Schinzel Phocomelia syndrome. However, in the case of Hecht Scott syndrome there seems to be no mutation in the WNT7A gene. Furthermore, there is a cluster of homeobox D genes on chromosome 2 that participates in the development of limbs. There is no evidence of mutations on these genes being the cause of Hecht Scott syndrome. There is no conclusive prognosis of mutation in genes causing Hecht Scott evidence but due to the high prevalence of this disease in males, it was suggested by Hecht and Scott that the disease has an "autosomal dominant gene with decreased penetrance or gonadal mosaicism." Evans et al. have also defined Hecht Scott syndrome as a "heterogeneous disorder with a dominant inheritance".

Hecht Scott syndrome often gets confused with Fuhrmann syndrome. However, in the case of Fuhrmann's syndrome, there is a homozygous mutation of WNT7A gene Furthermore, Fuhrmann syndrome patients present with pelvic and femur abnormalities.

== Treatment ==
There is no prevention of Hecht Scott syndrome as there is no clear understanding of the causation of this disease. However, there are possible methods to treat this disease. This includes:

- Uses of orthoses
- Limb lengthening
- Epiphysiodesis
- Early amputations
- Application of a prosthesis

There has been positive feedback with the use of Syme amputation.

== History ==
Hecht Scott syndrome was first described in literature in 1981 by Jacqueline T. Hecht and Charles I. Scott, Jr. They outlined the symptoms in a male and a female. Hecht and Scott suggested that there was a genetic etiology as the same symptoms appeared in half-siblings. They further narrowed it down to an "autosomal dominant mutant gene with decreased penetrance or gonadal mosaicism in the mother".

Courtens et al. first published their findings on Fibular Aplasia Tibial Campomelia and Oligosyndactyly (FATCO) in 2005 in the American Journal of Medical Genetics. They identified a newborn male with similar symptoms as described in Hecht and Scott's journal and four other cases. The common finding amongst all five journals was fibular aplasia, tibial campomelia, and oligosyndactly. Courtens et al. then proposed to call this disease fibular aplasia–tibial campomelia–oligosyndactyly (FATCO) syndrome. It was also named as Hecht Scott syndrome due to the authors of the original paper that described the disease.
