= Tibialis anterior muscle =

Flexor muscle in humans that dorsiflexes the foot on the talocrural joint

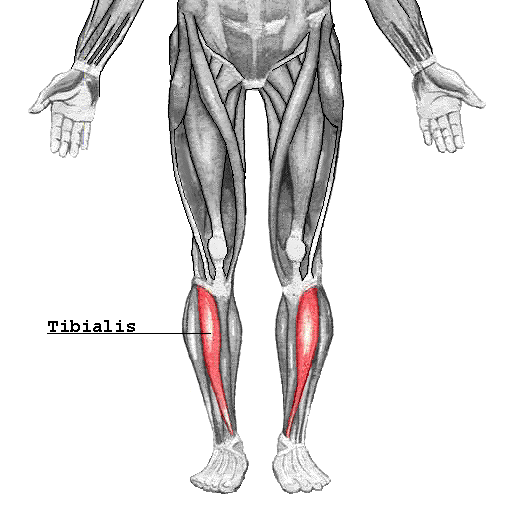
- Tibialis anterior

- Animation

Details
- Pronunciation: /ˌtɪbiˈeɪlɪs/ or /ˌtɪbiˈælɪs/
- Origin: From the upper 1/2 or 2/3 of the lateral surface of the tibia and the adjacent interosseous membrane
- Insertion: Medial cuneiform and the base of first metatarsal bone of the foot
- Artery: Anterior tibial artery
- Nerve: Deep fibular (peroneal) nerve (L5)
- Actions: Dorsiflexion and inversion of the foot
- Antagonist: Fibularis longus, gastrocnemius, soleus, plantaris, tibialis posterior

Identifiers
- Latin: musculus tibialis anterior
- TA98: A04.7.02.037
- TA2: 2644
- FMA: 22532

The tibialis anterior muscle is a muscle of the anterior compartment of the lower leg. It originates from the upper portion of the tibia; it inserts into the medial cuneiform and first metatarsal bones of the foot. It acts to dorsiflex and invert the foot. This muscle is mostly located near the shin.

It is situated on the lateral side of the tibia; it is thick and fleshy above, tendinous below. The tibialis anterior overlaps the anterior tibial vessels and deep peroneal nerve in the upper part of the leg.

== Structure ==
The tibialis anterior muscle is the most medial muscle of the anterior compartment of the leg.

The muscle ends in the anterior tibialis tendon, which is apparent on the anteriomedial dorsal aspect of the foot close to the ankle. Its tendon is ensheathed in a synovial sheath. The tendon passes through the medial compartment superior and inferior extensor retinacula of the foot.

=== Origin ===
The tibialis anterior muscle arises from the upper 2/3 of the lateral surface of the tibia and the adjoining part of the interosseous membrane and deep fascia overlying it, and the intermuscular septum between this muscle and the extensor digitorum longus.

=== Insertion ===
It is inserted into the medial and inferior surface of the medial cuneiform bone, and adjacent portion of the first metatarsal bone.'

=== Nerve supply ===
The tibialis anterior muscle is innervated by the deep fibular nerve, and recurrent genicular nerve (L4).

=== Variation ===
A deep portion of the muscle is rarely inserted into the talus, or a tendinous slip may pass to the head of the first metatarsal bone or the base of the first phalanx of the great toe.

The tibiofascialis anterior, a small muscle from the lower part of the tibia to the transverse or cruciate crural ligaments or deep fascia.

=== Actions/movements ===
The muscle acts to dorsiflex and invert the foot. It is the largest dorsiflexor of the foot. The muscle also contributes to deceleration.

== Function ==
The muscle helps maintain the medial longitudinal arch of the foot. It draws up and holds the toe in a locked position. The tibialis anterior aids in any activity that requires moving the leg or keeping the leg vertical. It functions to stabilize the ankle as the foot hits the ground during the contact phase of walking (eccentric contraction) and acts later to pull the foot clear of the ground during the swing phase (concentric contraction). It also functions to 'lock' the ankle, as in toe-kicking a ball, when held in an isometric contraction.

The movements of tibialis anterior are dorsiflexion and inversion of the ankle. However, actions of tibialis anterior are dependent on whether the foot is weight bearing or not (closed or open kinetic chain). When the foot is on the ground, the muscle helps to balance the leg and talus on the other tarsal bones so that the leg is kept vertical even when walking on uneven ground.

== Clinical significance ==
A tibialis anterior hernia is a rare type of hernia in which fat or other material protrudes through a defect in the tibialis anterior muscle. It may be caused by trauma, such as an inadvertent kick to the lower leg from an opposing player in a football match.

== Additional images ==
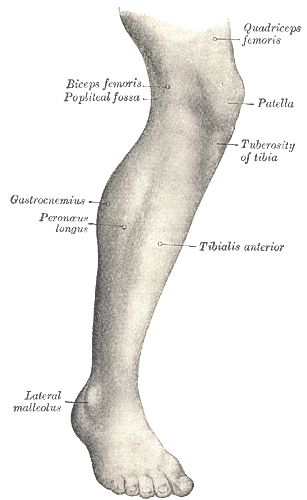
Right leg, lateral aspect

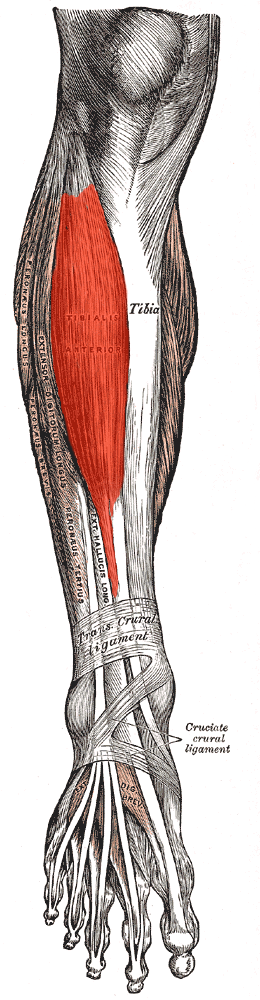
Tibialis anterior muscle

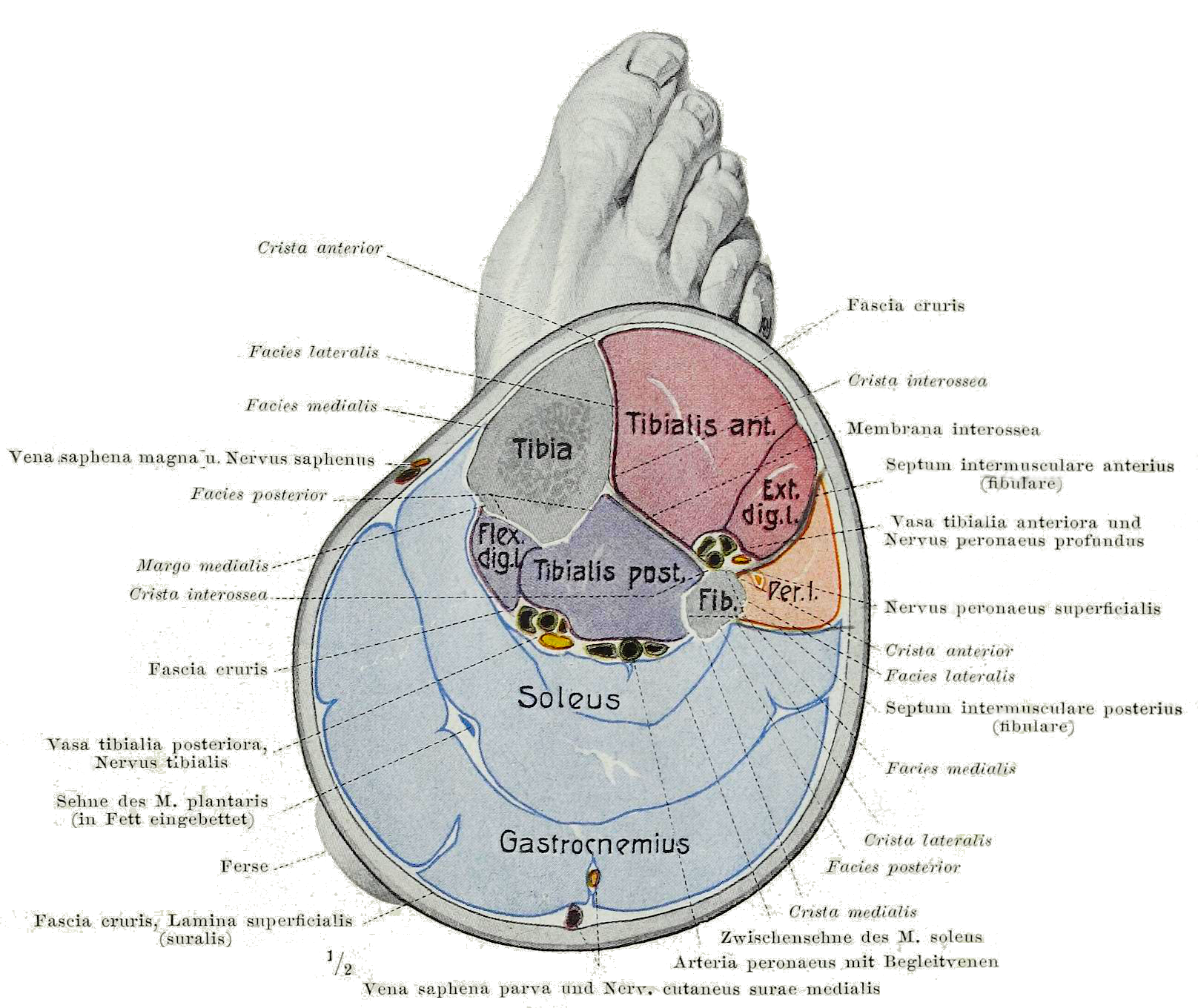
Cross-section through top third of lower right leg

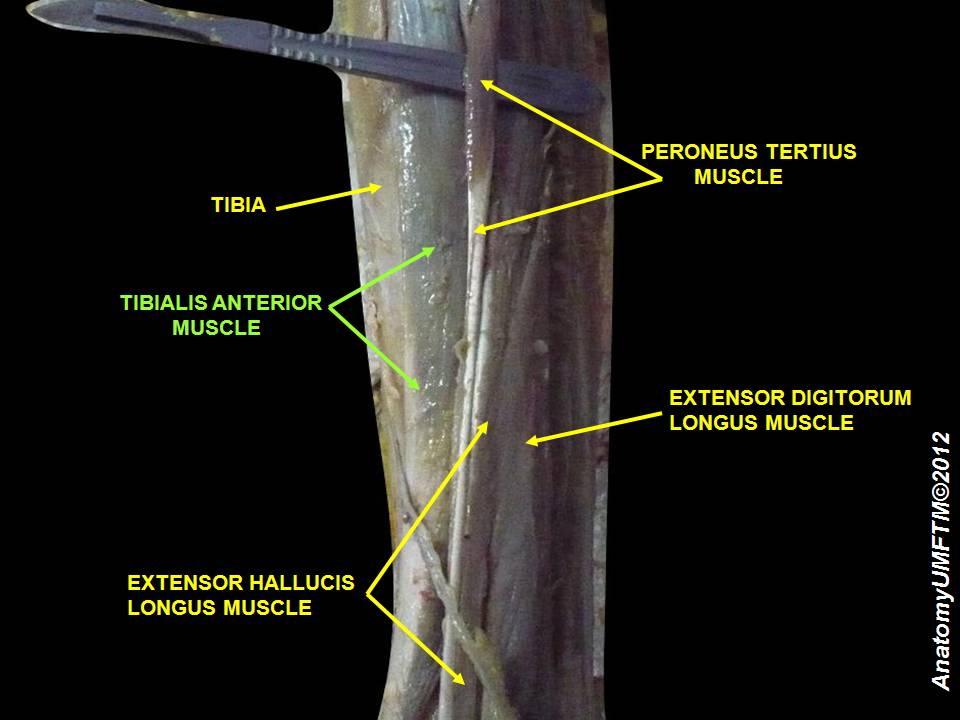
Tibialis anterior muscle. Dissection, coronal view

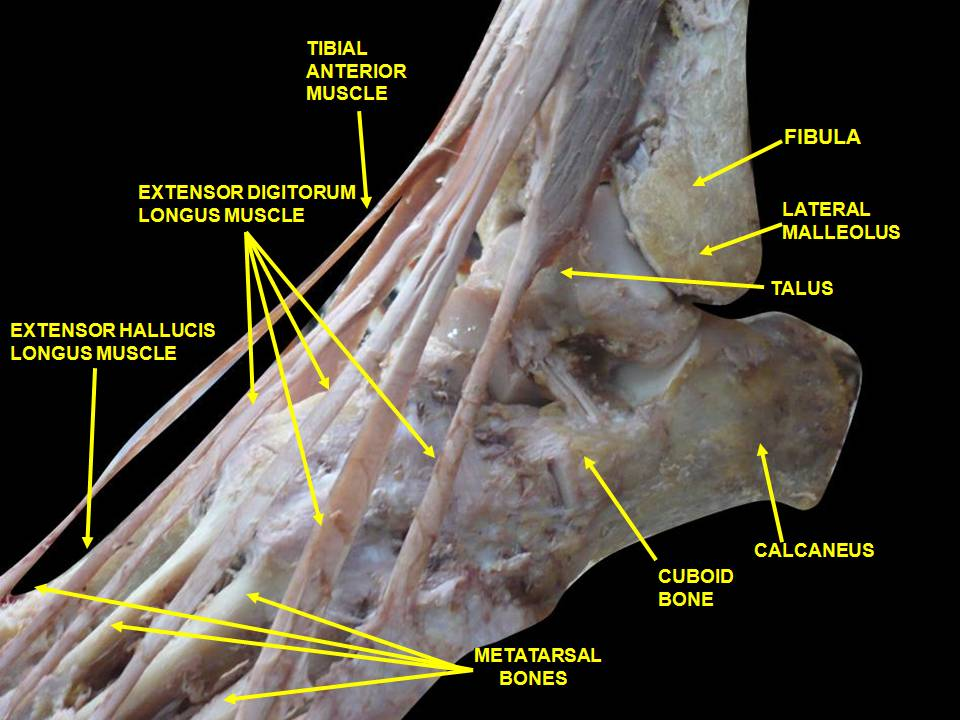
Ankle joint. Deep dissection, lateral view. This image has some structures labelled incorrectly: Tendons are misidentified here as "muscles"; actual cuboid bone is anterior to region of calcaneus indicated

== See also ==
- Tibialis posterior muscle
