= Interosseous membrane of leg =

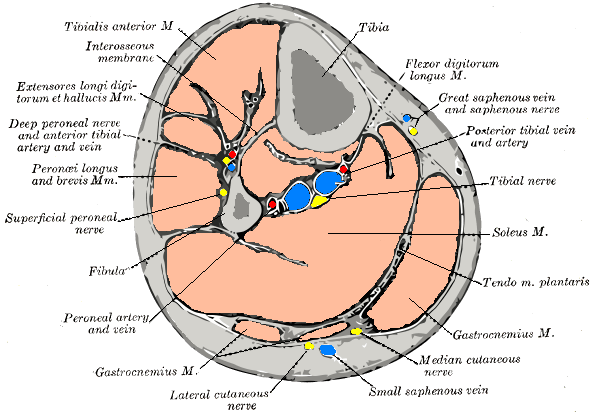
- Cross-section through middle of left leg. (Interosseus membrane labeled at upper left.)

Details

Identifiers
- Latin: membrana interossea cruris, ligamentum tibiofibulare medium
- TA98: A03.6.05.002
- TA2: 1867
- FMA: 35187

The interosseous membrane of the leg (middle tibiofibular ligament) is a fibrous membrane which extends between the interosseous crests of the tibia and fibula that helps stabilize the bones’ relationship and separates the muscles on the front from those on the back.

== Description ==
It consists of a thin aponeurotic joint lamina composed of oblique fibers running downward and laterally, with a few passing transversely.

Broader above than below, its upper margin does not quite reach the tibiofibular joint. Above the joint’s free concave border is a large oval aperture for the passage of the anterior tibial vessels to the front of the leg.

In its lower part is an opening for the passage of the anterior peroneal vessels.

It is continuous below with the interosseous ligament of the tibiofibular syndesmosis, and presents numerous perforations for the passage of small vessels.

In front of the interosseous membrane are the tibialis anterior, extensor digitorum longus, extensor hallucis proprius, peronæus tertius, the anterior tibial vessels, and deep peroneal nerve; behind are the tibialis posterior and flexor hallucis longus.

== Gallery ==
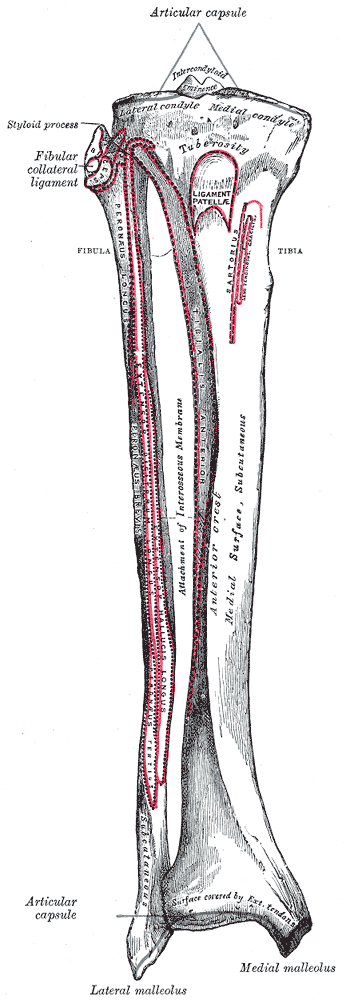
Anterior surface of bones of the right leg.

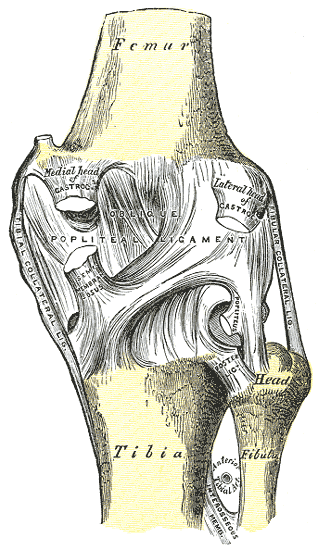
Posterior view of the right knee-joint.

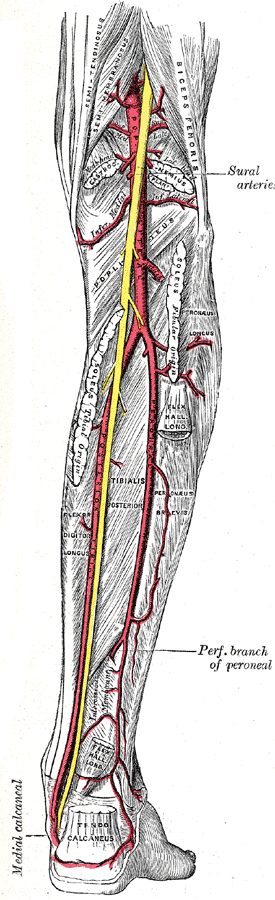
Popliteal, posterior tibial, and peroneal arteries.

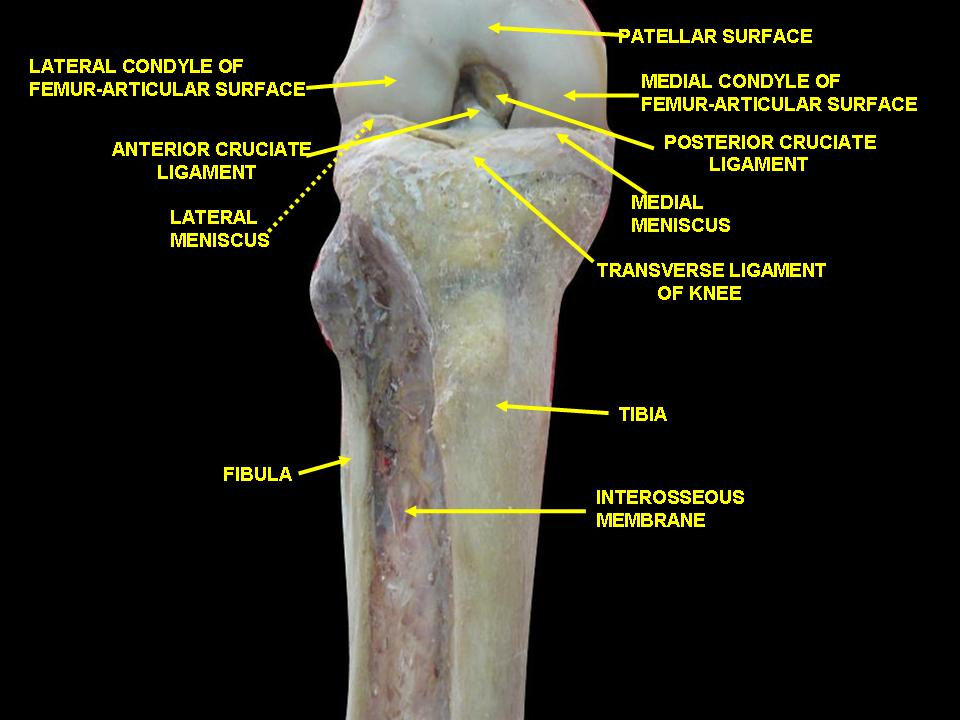
Anterior view of a deep dissection of the knee and tibiofibular joint.

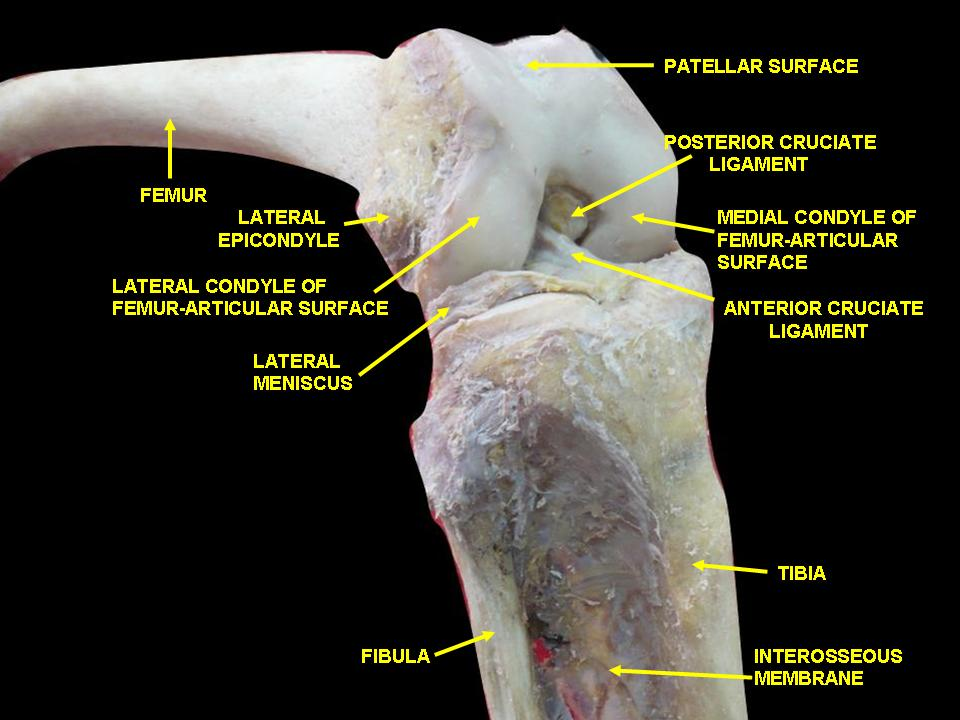
Anterior view of a deep dissection of the knee and tibiofibular joint.

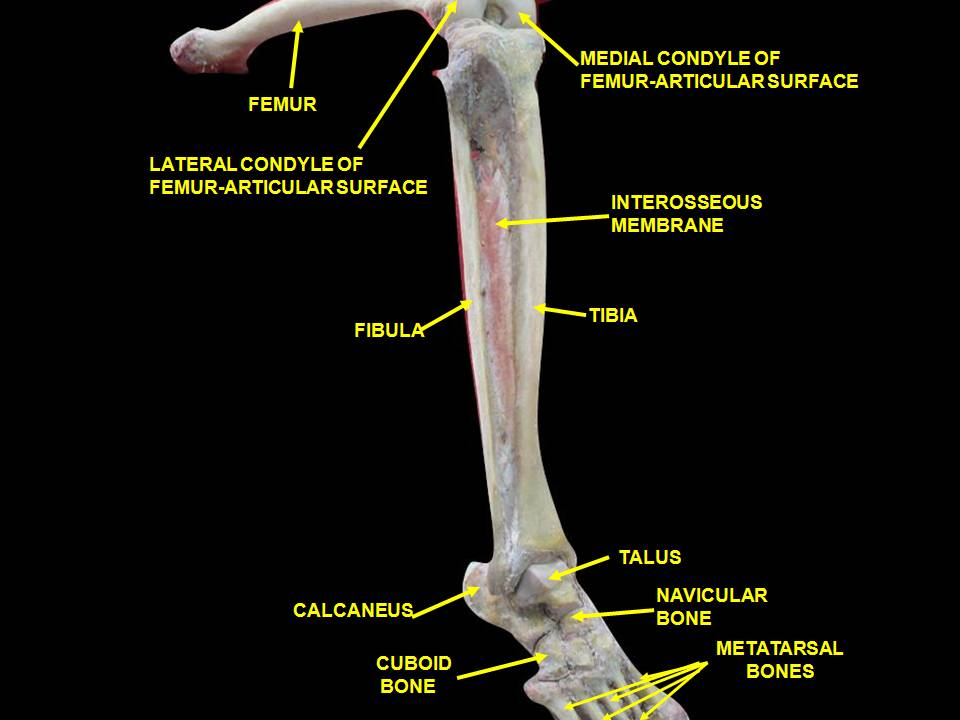
Anterolateral view of a deep dissection of the knee, tibiofibular and ankle joints.

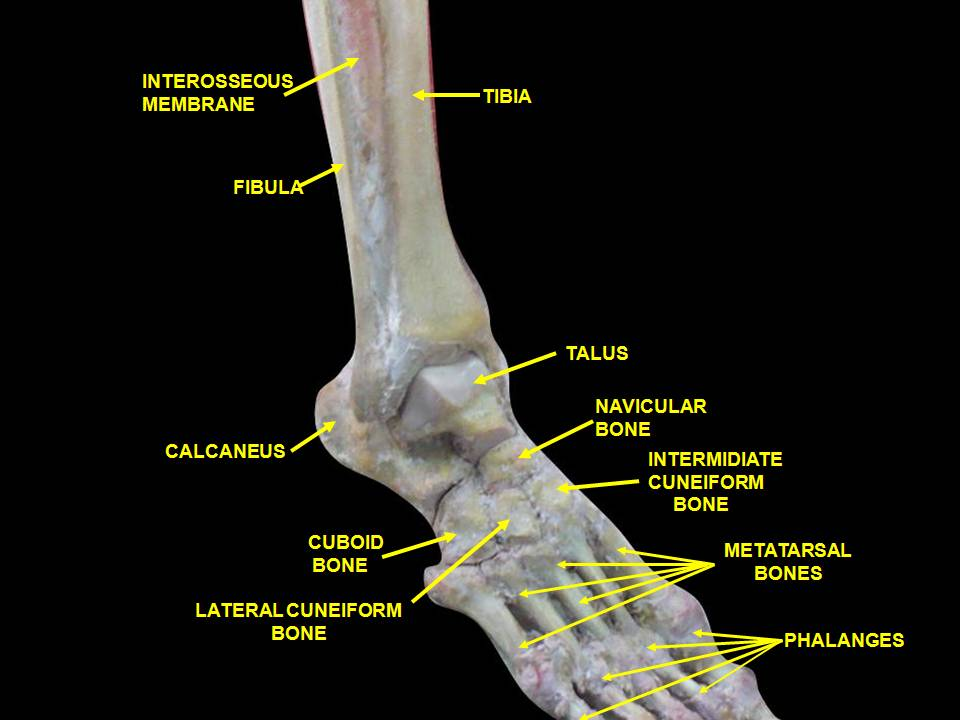
Anterolateral view of a deep dissection of the knee, tibiofibular and ankle joints.
