= Extensor digitorum longus muscle =

Pennate muscle, situated at the lateral part of the front of the leg

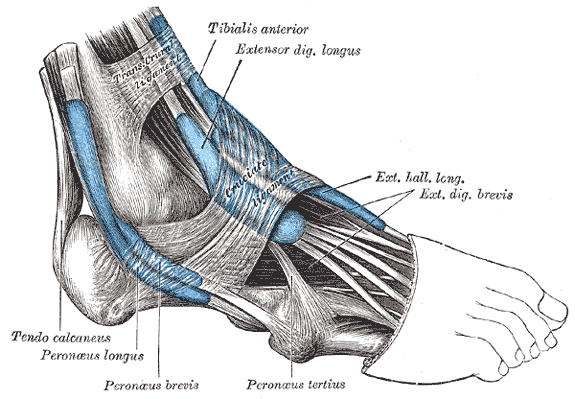
- The mucous sheaths of the tendons around the ankle. Lateral aspect. (Extensor dig. longus labeled at upper right.)

- Animation

Details
- Origin: Anterior lateral condyle of tibia, anterior shaft of fibula and superior 3/4 of interosseous membrane
- Insertion: Dorsal surface; middle and distal phalanges of lateral four digits
- Artery: Anterior tibial artery
- Nerve: Deep fibular nerve
- Actions: Extension of toes and dorsiflexion of ankle
- Antagonist: Flexor digitorum longus, flexor digitorum brevis

Identifiers
- Latin: musculus extensor digitorum longus
- TA98: A04.7.02.038
- TA2: 2645
- FMA: 22534

The extensor digitorum longus is a pennate muscle, situated at the lateral part of the front of the leg.

== Structure ==
It arises from the lateral condyle of the tibia; from the upper three-quarters of the anterior surface of the body of the fibula; from the upper part of the interosseous membrane; from the deep surface of the fascia; and from the intermuscular septa between it and the tibialis anterior on the medial, and the peroneal muscles on the lateral side. Between it and the tibialis anterior are the upper portions of the anterior tibial vessels and deep peroneal nerve.

The muscle passes under the superior and inferior extensor retinaculum of foot in company with the fibularis tertius, and divides into four slips, which run forward on the dorsum of the foot, and are inserted into the second and third phalanges of the four lesser toes.

The tendons to the second, third, and fourth toes are each joined, opposite the metatarsophalangeal articulations, on the lateral side by a tendon of the extensor digitorum brevis. The tendons are inserted in the following manner: each receives a fibrous expansion from the interossei and lumbricals, and then spreads out into a broad aponeurosis, which covers the dorsal surface of the first phalanx: this aponeurosis, at the articulation of the first with the second phalanx, divides into three slips — an intermediate, which is inserted into the base of the second phalanx; and two collateral slips, which, after uniting on the dorsal surface of the second phalanx, are continued onward, to be inserted into the base of the third phalanx.

=== Variations ===
This muscle varies considerably in the modes of origin and the arrangement of its various tendons.

The tendons to the second and fifth toes may be found doubled, or extra slips are given off from one or more tendons to their corresponding metatarsal bones, or to the short extensor, or to one of the interosseous muscles.

In 2025, a slip to the great toe was found in each foot, notably originating from slightly different positions along the EDL.

== See also ==
- Extensor digitorum brevis muscle
- Extensor digitorum muscle

== Additional images ==
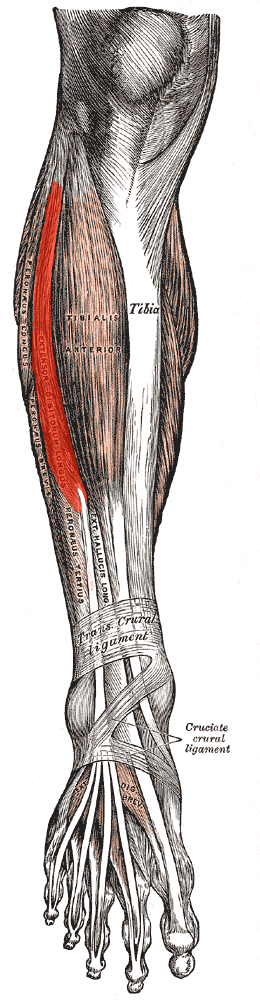
Extensor digitorum longus muscle (in red)

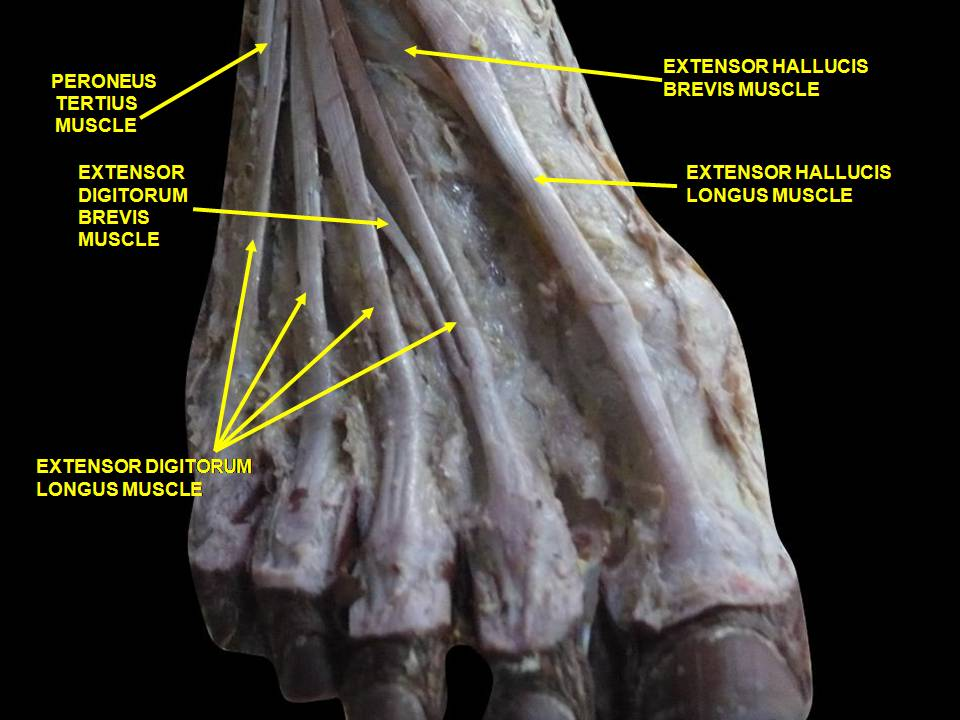
Dorsum of Foot. Deep dissection.

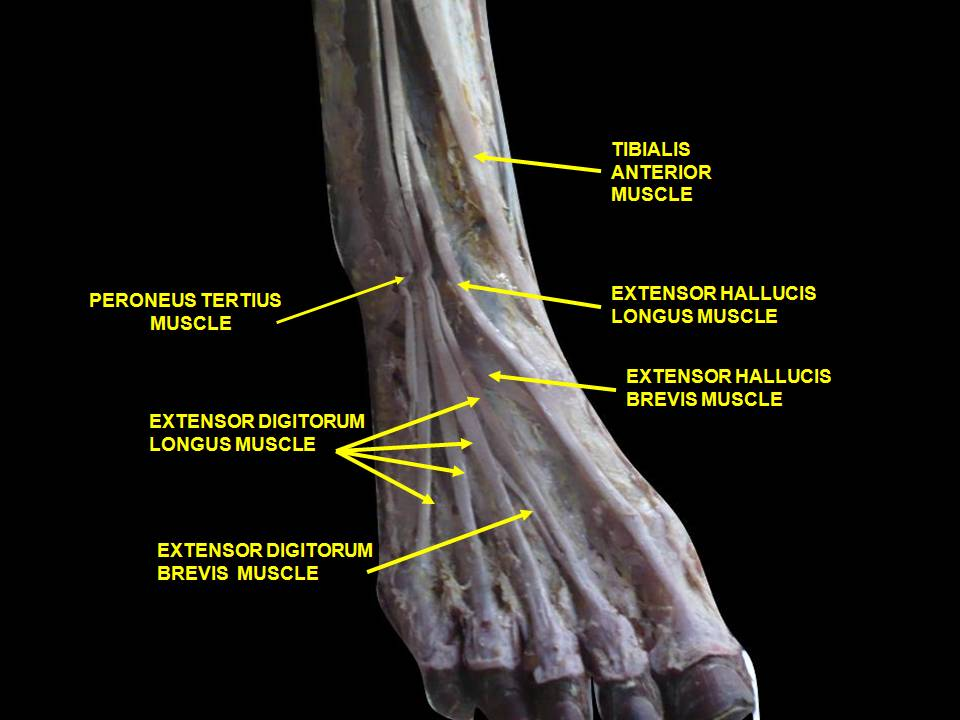
Dorsum of Foot. Deep dissection.

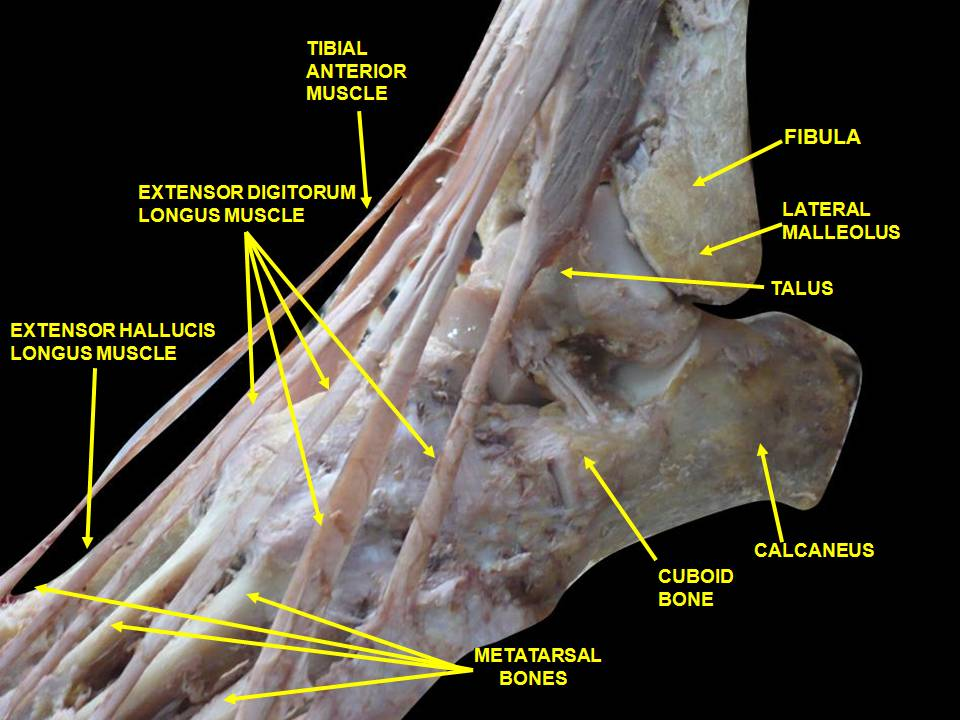
Ankle joint. Deep dissection. Lateral view.
