= Lateral retinaculum =

Tissue on the outer side of the kneecap

Identifiers
- TA98: A03.6.08.017
- TA2: 2624
- FMA: 44590

The lateral retinaculum is the fibrous tissue on the lateral (outer) side of the kneecap (patella). The kneecap has both a medial (on the inner aspect) and a lateral (on the outer side) retinaculum, and these help to support the kneecap in its position in relation to the femur bone underneath it.

The lateral retinaculum is an extension of the fibrous 'aponeurosis' of the vastus lateralis muscle (itself a part of the quadriceps muscles making up the 'lap').
