= Superior extensor retinaculum of foot =

Upper part of the extensor retinaculum of foot

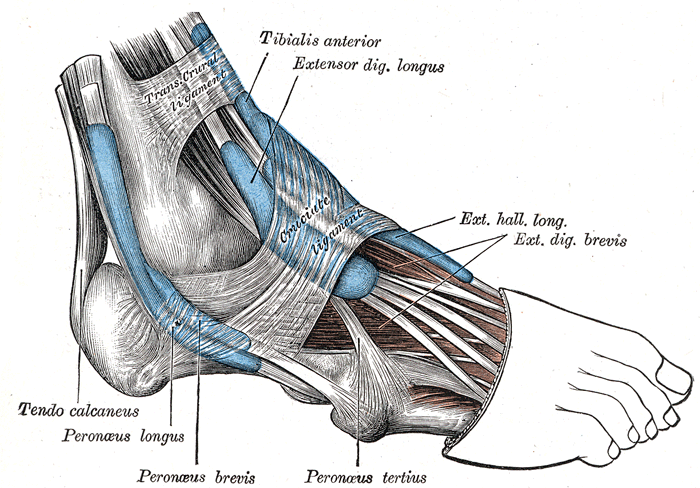
- The mucous sheaths of the tendons around the ankle. Lateral aspect. Trans. crural ligament labeled near top.

Details

Identifiers
- Latin: retinaculum musculorum extensorum superius pedis, ligamentum transversum cruris
- TA98: A04.7.03.025
- TA2: 2712
- FMA: 49384

The superior extensor retinaculum of the foot (transverse crural ligament) is the upper part of the extensor retinaculum of the foot which extends from the ankle to the heelbone.

The superior extensor retinaculum binds down the tendons of extensor digitorum longus, extensor hallucis longus, peroneus tertius, and tibialis anterior as they descend on the front of the tibia and fibula; under it are found also the anterior tibial vessels and deep peroneal nerve.

It is found on the lateral side of the lower leg, attached laterally to the lower end of the fibula, and medially to the tibia; above it is continuous with the fascia of the leg.

== Additional images ==
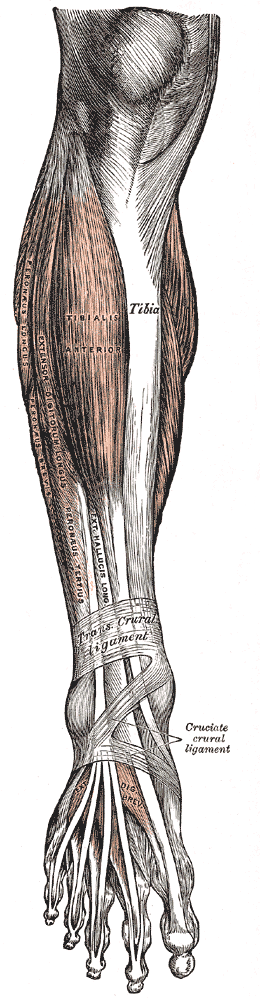
Muscles of the front of the leg.

== See also ==
- Peroneal retinacula
