= Inferior extensor retinaculum of the foot =

Y-shaped band placed in front of the ankle-joint

Inferior extensor retinaculum of foot
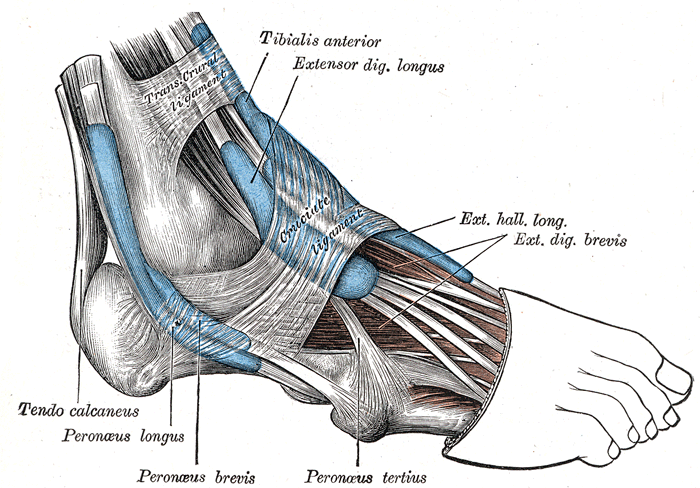
- The mucous sheaths of the tendons around the ankle. Lateral aspect.

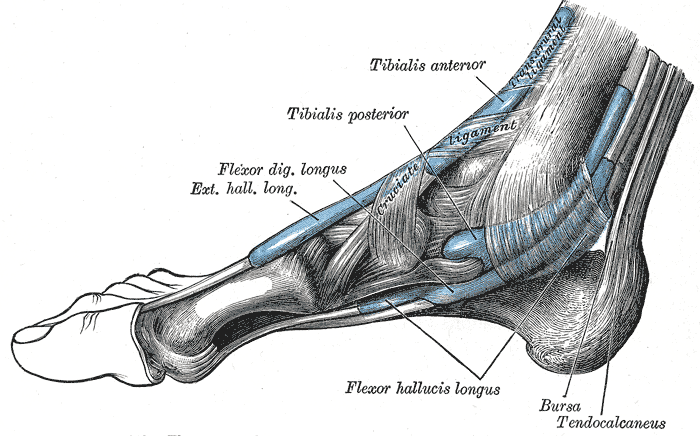
- The mucous sheaths of the tendons around the ankle. Medial aspect.

Details

Identifiers
- Latin: retinaculum musculorum extensorum inferius pedis, ligamentum cruciatum cruris
- TA98: A04.7.03.027
- TA2: 2713
- FMA: 49385

The inferior extensor retinaculum of the foot (cruciate crural ligament, lower part of anterior annular ligament) is a Y-shaped ligamentous band placed in front of the ankle-joint, the stem of the Y being attached laterally to the upper surface of the calcaneus, in front of the depression for the interosseous talocalcaneal ligament; it is directed medialward as a double layer, one lamina passing in front of, and the other behind, the tendons of the peroneus tertius and extensor digitorum longus.

These two layers join at the medial border of the latter tendon, forming a compartment enclosing the tendons.

From the medial extremity of this sheath, the two limbs of the Y diverge: one is directed upward and medialward, to be attached to the medial malleolus, passing over the extensor hallucis longus and the vessels and nerves but enclosing the tibialis anterior by a splitting of its fibers.

The other limb extends downward and medialward, to be attached to the border of the plantar aponeurosis, and passes over the tendons of the extensor hallucis longus and tibialis anterior and also the vessels and nerves.

== Additional images ==
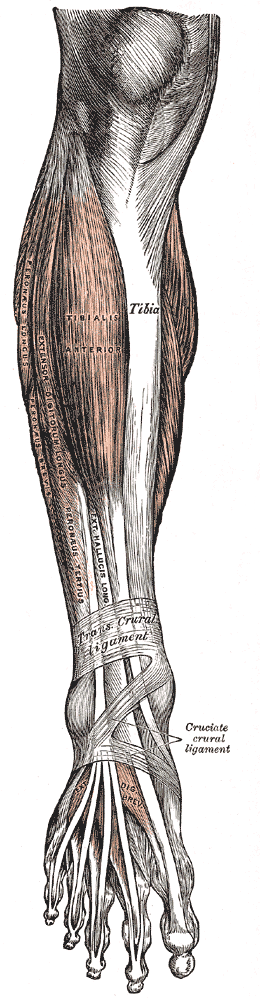
Muscles of the front of the leg.

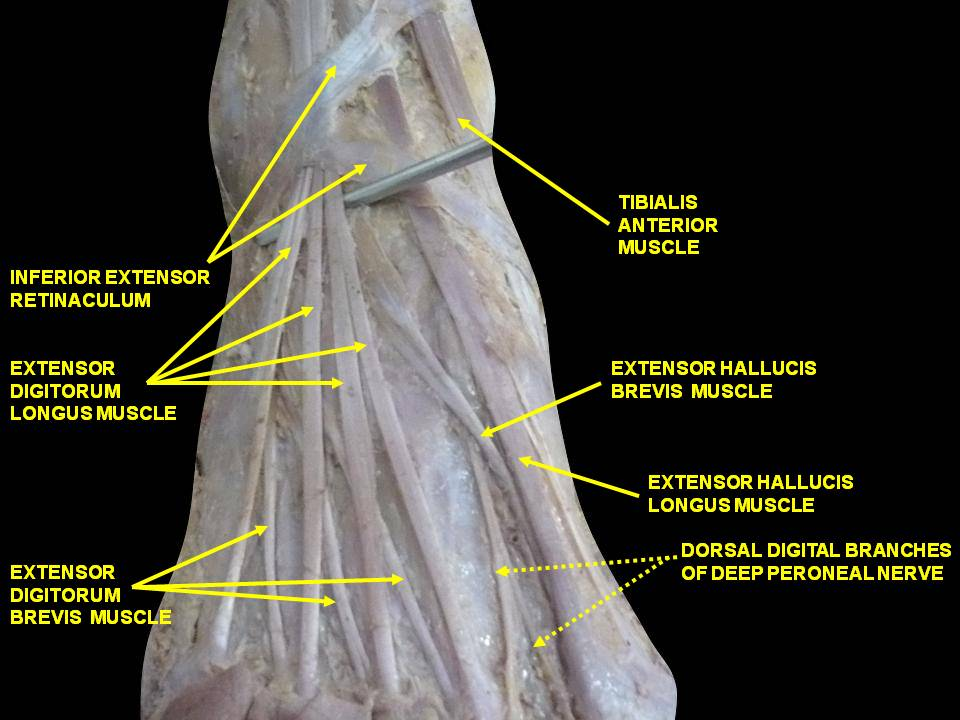
Inferior extensor retinaculum of foot. Deep dissection.

== See also ==
- Cruciate ligament
