= Ligament of the head of the fibula =

Ligament of the head of the fibula may refer to:

- Anterior ligament of the head of the fibula
- Posterior ligament of the head of the fibula
