= Superior tibiofibular joint =

Joint in the knee

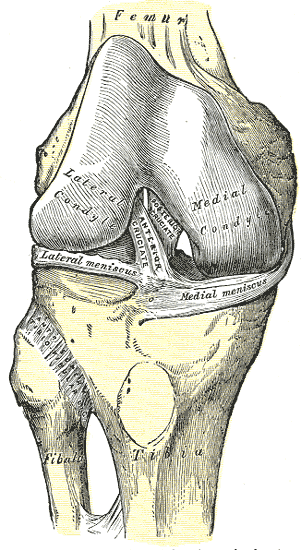
- Right knee-joint, from the front, showing interior ligaments.

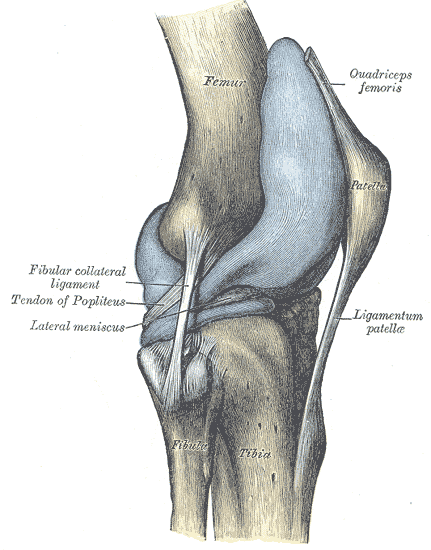
- Capsule of right knee-joint (distended). Lateral aspect.

Details

Identifiers
- Latin: articulatio tibiofibularis
- FMA: 35184

The superior tibiofibular joint (also called proximal tibiofibular joint) is an arthrodial joint between the lateral condyle of tibia and the head of the fibula.

The contiguous surfaces of the bones present flat, oval facets covered with cartilage and connected together by an articular capsule and by anterior and posterior fibula head ligaments.

When the term tibiofibular articulation is used without a modifier, it refers to the proximal, not the distal (i.e., inferior) tibiofibular articulation.

== Clinical significance ==
Injuries to the proximal tibiofibular joint are uncommon and usually associated with other injuries to the lower leg. Dislocations can be classified into the following five types:

- Anterolateral dislocation (most common)
- Posteromedial dislocation
- Superior dislocation (uncommon, associated with shortened tibia fractures or severe ankle injuries)
- Inferior dislocation (rare, associated with lengthened tibia fractures or avulsion of the foot, usually extensive soft tissue injury and poor prognosis)
- Chronic instability (subluxation)

As there are often concomitant fractures and ligamentous injuries (e.g., ankle fracture), anterolateral and posteromedial dislocations may be overlooked on first examination, with the potential to cause chronic instability. If the dislocation is recognized and treated properly, prognosis is typically good, although injury to the common peroneal nerve may occur. Inferior dislocations are exceptional as they usually only occur in avulsion (traumatic amputation) injuries. Subluxation may also occur in diseases with ligamentous laxity (e.g., Ehlers-Danlos Syndrome), muscle weakness (e.g., muscular dystrophy), or secondarily to degeneration (e.g., in rheumatoid arthritis).
