= Flexor longus muscle =

Flexor longus muscle may refer to:

- Flexor digitorum longus muscle
- Flexor hallucis longus muscle
- Flexor pollicis longus muscle
