= Ligamentum capitis =

Ligamentum capitis may refer to:

- Ligamentum capitis costae intraarticulare, intra-articular ligament of head of rib
- Ligamentum capitis costae radiatum, radiate ligament of head of rib
- Ligamentum capitis femoris, ligament of head of femur
- Ligamentum capitis fibulae anterius, anterior ligament of the head of the fibula
- Ligamentum capitis fibulae posterius, posterior ligament of the head of the fibula
