= Condyle of tibia =

Condyle of tibia may refer to:

- Lateral condyle of tibia
- Medial condyle of tibia
