= FHL =

FHL may refer to:

- Fachhochschule Lübeck, a German university
- Familial hemophagocytic lymphohistiocytosis
- Family History Library, a genealogical research facility in Salt Lake City, Utah, United States
- Federal Hockey League, an American ice hockey league
- Federal Hockey League (Canada), a defunct Canadian ice hockey league
- Flexor hallucis longus muscle
- Friday Harbor Laboratories, a marine biology field station of the University of Washington
