= Lateral condyle =

Lateral condyle can refer to:

- Lateral condyle of tibia
- Lateral condyle of femur
- Lateral condyle of the distal humerus
