= Soleal line =

Prominent ridge on the posterior surface of the tibia

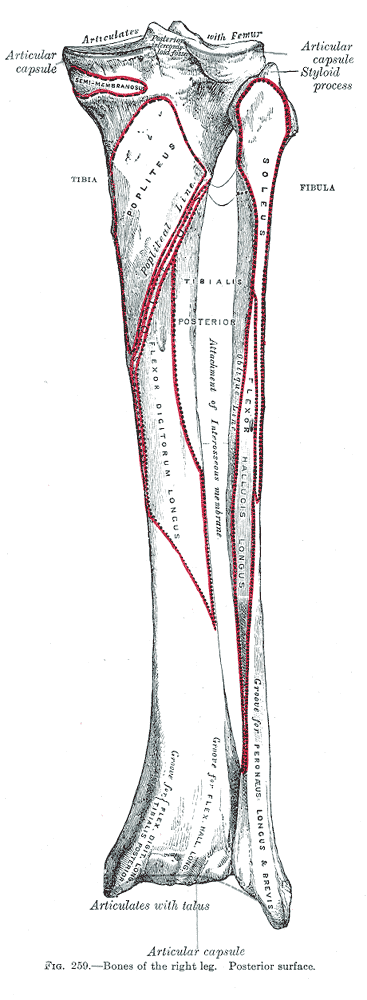
- Bones of the right leg. Posterior surface. (Popliteal line visible at top center.)

Details

Identifiers
- Latin: linea musculi solei
- TA98: A02.5.06.015
- TA2: 1417
- FMA: 43773

The soleal line, also known as the popliteal line (in older texts), is a prominent ridge on the posterior surface of the tibia. It is the site of many muscle origins and insertions, such as those of popliteus muscle, soleus muscle, flexor digitorum longus muscle, and tibialis posterior muscle.

== Structure ==
The soleal line is a prominent ridge on the posterior surface of the tibia. It extends obliquely downward from the back part of the articular facet for the fibula to the medial border, at the junction of its upper and middle thirds.

=== Development ===
The soleal line becomes more prominent between childhood and adulthood. It is rarely seen in children between the ages of 6 and 8.

== Function ==
The soleal line marks the lower limit of the insertion of the popliteus muscle. It is the attachment of the fascia covering this muscle. It is the origin of part of soleus muscle (along with a triangular area above it), flexor digitorum longus muscle, and tibialis posterior muscle.
