= Intercondyloid fossa =

Intercondyloid fossa may refer to:

- Intercondylar area of the upper tibia, including the anterior intercondyloid fossa and posterior intercondyloid fossa
- Intercondylar fossa of femur
