= Intercondylar area =

Region of the tibia bone

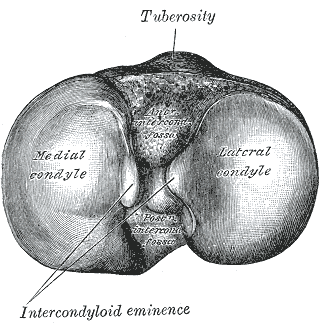
- Upper surface of right tibia. (Posterior intercondyloid fossa visible at bottom.)

Details

Identifiers
- Latin: area intercondylaris
- TA2: 1402
- FMA: 66204

The intercondylar area is the separation between the medial and lateral condyle on the upper extremity of the tibia. The anterior and posterior cruciate ligaments and the menisci attach to the intercondylar area.

The intercondyloid eminence is composed of the medial and lateral intercondylar tubercles, and divides the intercondylar area into an anterior and a posterior area.

== Structure ==
=== Anterior area ===
The anterior intercondylar area (or anterior intercondyloid fossa) is an area on the tibia, a bone in the lower leg. Together with the posterior intercondylar area it makes up the intercondylar area.

The intercondylar area is the separation between the medial and lateral condyle located toward the proximal portion of the tibia. The intercondylar eminence composed of the medial and lateral intercondylar tubercle divides the intercondylar area into anterior and posterior part.

The anterior intercondylar area is the location where the anterior cruciate ligament attaches to the tibia.

=== Intercondyloid eminence ===
The intercondyloid eminence, intercondylar eminence or tibial spine is a structure of the tibia. It lies between the articular facets of the proximal tibia, but nearer the posterior than the anterior aspect of the bone, surmounted on either side by a prominent tubercle, on to the sides of which the articular facets are prolonged. In front of and behind the intercondyloid eminence are rough depressions (fossae) for the attachment of the anterior and posterior cruciate ligaments and the menisci.

Two tubercles emerge from the eminence:

- The medial intercondylar tubercle is a protrusion on the medial condyle.
- The lateral intercondylar tubercle is a protrusion on the lateral condyle.

It can be involved in fractures.

=== Posterior area ===
Posteriorly, the medial condyle and lateral condyle are separated from each other by a shallow depression, the posterior intercondyloid fossa (or intercondylar area), which gives attachment to part of the posterior cruciate ligament of the knee.
