= Anterior superior =

Anterior superior may refer to:

- Anterior superior alveolar nerve
- Anterior superior iliac spine
- Anterior superior ligament
- Anterior superior pancreaticoduodenal artery
