= Medial condyle =

Medial condyle may refer to:

- Medial condyle of tibia
- Medial condyle of femur
