= Flexor digitorum longus muscle =

Muscle located on the tibial side of the leg

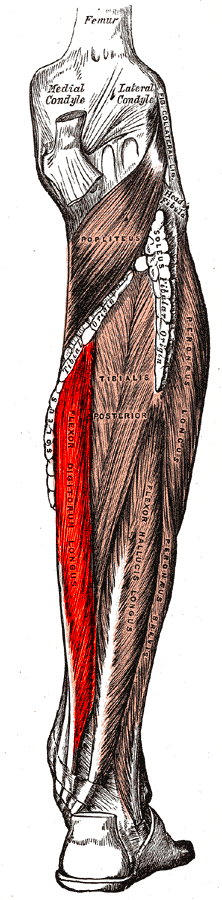

- View from below

Details
- Origin: Posterior surface of the body of the tibia
- Insertion: Plantar surface; base of the distal phalanges of the four lesser toes
- Artery: Posterior tibial artery
- Nerve: Tibial nerve
- Actions: Flexion of the four smaller digits
- Antagonist: Extensor digitorum longus, extensor digitorum brevis

Identifiers
- Latin: musculus flexor digitorum longus
- TA98: A04.7.02.052
- TA2: 2667
- FMA: 51071

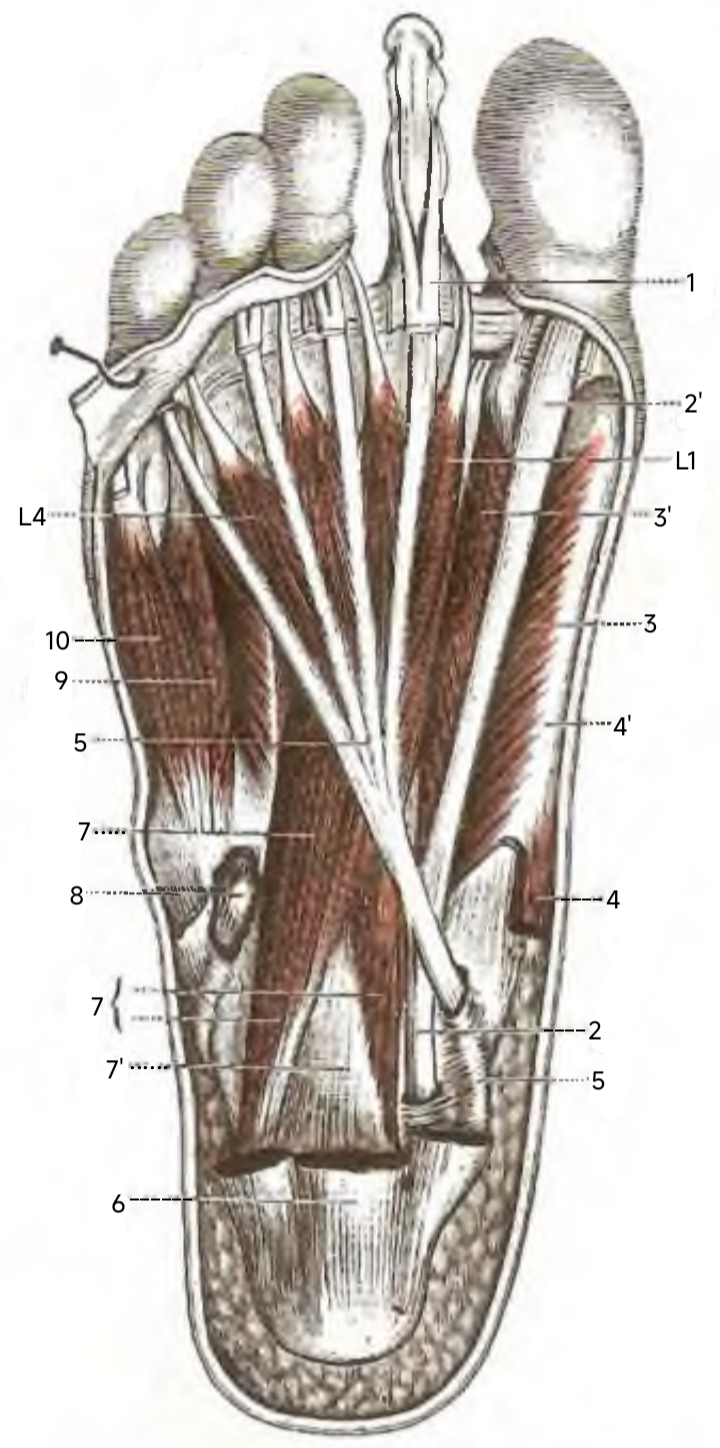
Flexor digitorum longus tendon (labeled 5) and surrounding structures. Flexor hallucis longus tendon is labeled 2, 2'. Note the chiasma plantare. Right side, inferior view. (After Testut's Anatomy.)

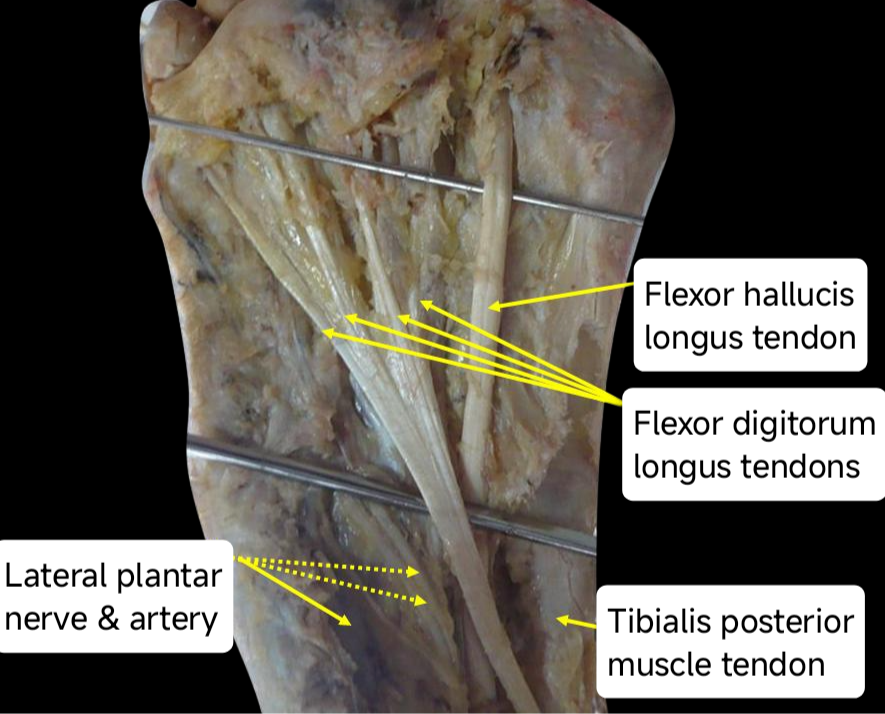
Cadaveric piece showing the flexor digitorum longus and flexor hallucis longus tendons of the right foot. Lower probe is at chiasma plantare.

The flexor digitorum longus muscle or flexor digitorum communis longus is situated on the tibial side of the leg. At its origin it is thin and pointed, but it gradually increases in size as it descends. It serves to flex the second, third, fourth, and fifth toes.

== Structure ==
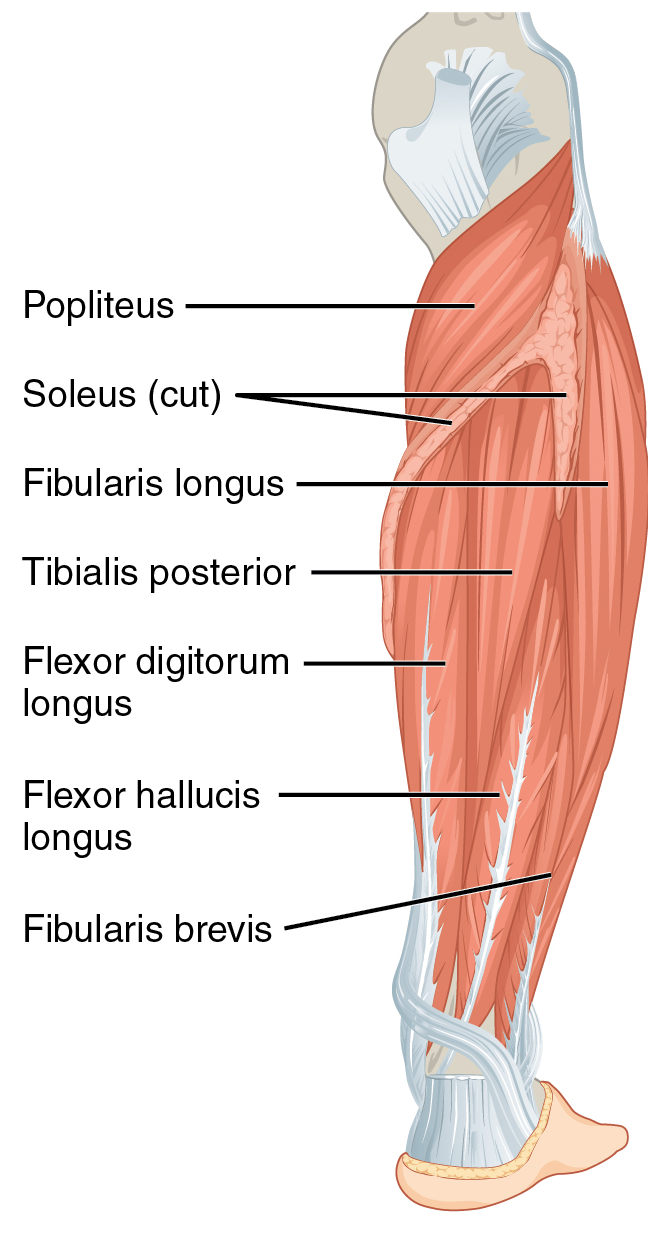
The flexor digitorum longus runs along the medial posterior side of the lower leg and aids in flexions of the toes (apart from the big toe).

The flexor digitorum longus muscle arises from the posterior surface of the body of the tibia, from immediately below the soleal line to within 7.5 cm of its lower extremity, medial to the tibial origin of the tibialis posterior muscle. It also arises from the fascia covering the tibialis posterior muscle.

The fibers end in a tendon, which runs nearly the whole length of the posterior surface of the muscle. This tendon passes behind the medial malleolus, in a groove, common to it and the tibialis posterior, but separated from the latter by a fibrous septum, each tendon being contained in a special compartment lined by a separate mucous sheath. The tendon of the tibialis posterior and the tendon of the flexor digitorum longus cross each other ("dig over tib") at a spot above the medial malleolus, the so-called chiasma crurale. It passes through the tarsal tunnel.

It passes obliquely forward and lateralward, superficial to the deltoid ligament of the ankle-joint, into the sole of the foot, where it crosses over the tendon of the flexor hallucis longus at the level of the navicular bone at a location known as the "master knot of Henry" (also referred to as chiasma plantare), and receives from it a strong tendinous slip.

It then expands and is joined by the quadratus plantæ muscle, and finally divides into four tendons, which are inserted into the bases of the last phalanges of the second, third, fourth, and fifth toes, each tendon passing through an opening in the corresponding tendon of the flexor digitorum brevis muscle opposite the base of the first interphalangeal joint.

=== Variation ===
Flexor accessorius longus digitorum, not infrequent, origin from fibula, or tibia, or the deep fascia and ending in a tendon which, after passing beneath the laciniate ligament, joins the tendon of the long flexor or the quadratus plantæ.

== Function ==
Similar to the flexor hallucis longus and tibialis posterior muscles, the flexor digitorum longus muscle functions to plantar flex and invert the foot. The flexor digitorum longus muscle is responsible for the movement and curling of the second, third, fourth and fifth toes. This muscle makes it possible for the toes to grip the surface of floors, which is important when it comes to maintaining postural balance on surfaces that are rough or uneven. The other deep muscles are the flexor hallucis longus and tibialis posterior; the tibialis posterior is the most powerful of these deep muscles. All three muscles are innervated by the tibial nerve which comprises half of the sciatic nerve.

== Clinical significance ==
After passing through the tarsal tunnel, the flexor digitorum longus tendon must curve around a bony landmark called the sustentaculum tali. Flexor digitorum longus pain can occur with a trip and fall on uneven surface when the toes are not able to grip the surface totally. One can also injure the flexor digitorum longus muscle while running on a beach in the sand without any footwear, making the muscle vulnerable at the calcaneus attachment for injuries. In case of flexor digitorum longus pain or strain, the patient will find it tough to walk and will have excruciating pain in the feet and ankles. Support braces along with warm compresses are the preferred manner of treating flexor digitorum longus pain or strain.

== See also ==
- Flexor digitorum brevis muscle
