= Popliteus muscle =

Muscle responsible for unlocking the knees during walking

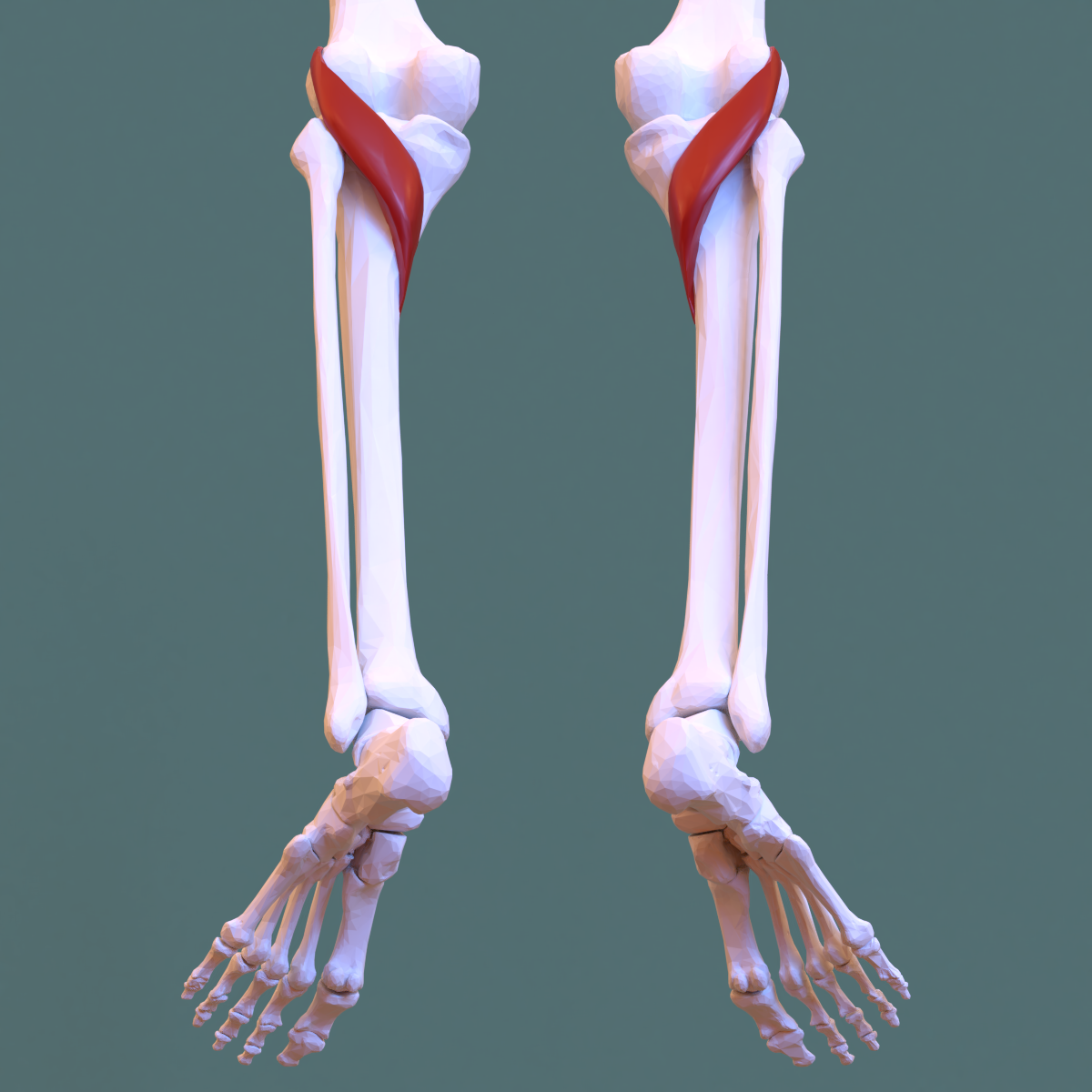
- Popliteus muscle (shown in red)
- Dissection video (2 min 22 s)

Details
- Origin: Lateral femoral epicondyle
- Insertion: Posterior surface of the tibia proximal to the soleus line
- Artery: Popliteal artery
- Nerve: Tibial nerve
- Actions: Medially rotates tibia on the femur if the femur is fixed (sitting down) or laterally rotates femur on the tibia if tibia is fixed (standing up), unlocks the knee to allow flexion (bending), helps to prevent the forward dislocation of the femur while crouching

Identifiers
- Latin: musculus popliteus, poplit=ham (pit) of the knee
- TA98: A04.7.02.050
- TA2: 2665
- FMA: 22590

The popliteus muscle in the leg is used for unlocking the knees when walking, by laterally rotating the femur on the tibia during the closed chain portion of the gait cycle (one with the foot in contact with the ground). In open chain movements (when the involved limb is not in contact with the ground), the popliteus muscle medially rotates the tibia on the femur. It is also used when sitting down and standing up. It is the only muscle in the posterior (back) compartment of the lower leg that acts just on the knee and not on the ankle. The gastrocnemius muscle acts on both joints.

== Structure ==
The popliteus muscle originates from the lateral surface of the lateral condyle of the femur by a rounded tendon. Its fibers pass downward and medially. It inserts onto the posterior surface of tibia, above the soleal line. The popliteus tendon runs beneath the lateral collateral ligament and tendon of biceps femoris. The muscle also runs above the lateral meniscus but has no connection with the meniscus in 45% of the cases, but has strong connection with it in 17.5% of the cases. Therefore, popliteus muscle is extrasynovial, extra-articular, and intracapsular.

=== Nerve supply ===
The popliteus muscle is supplied by the tibial nerve, from spinal roots L5 and S1.

=== Variation ===
There is sometimes an additional head from the sesamoid bone in the lateral (outer) head of the gastrocnemius muscle.

Rarely an additional inconstant muscle; the popliteus minor is seen. It originates from the femur on the inner side of the plantaris muscle and inserts into the posterior ligament of the knee-joint.

Peroneotibialis, 14% of population. Origin is inner side of the head of the fibula, insertion into the upper end of the oblique line of the tibia, it lies beneath the popliteus.

Another variant, the cyamella, is a small sesamoid bone embedded in the tendon of the popliteus muscle. It is rarely seen in humans, with prevalence rates from 0.57–1.8%, but has been described more often in other primates and certain other animals.

== Function ==
The popliteus assists in flexing the leg upon the thigh; when the leg is flexed, it will rotate the tibia inward.

It is especially called into action at the beginning of the act of bending the knee, in as much as it produces the slight inward rotation of the tibia, which is essential in the early stage of this movement.

When the knee is in full extension, the femur slightly medially rotates on the tibia to lock the knee joint in place. Popliteus is often referred to as the "Key" to unlocking the knee since it begins knee flexion by laterally rotating the femur on the tibia.

Popliteus is also attached to the lateral meniscus in the knee and draws it posteriorly during knee flexion to prevent crushing the meniscus between the tibia and femur as the knee flexes.

== Additional images ==
Animation

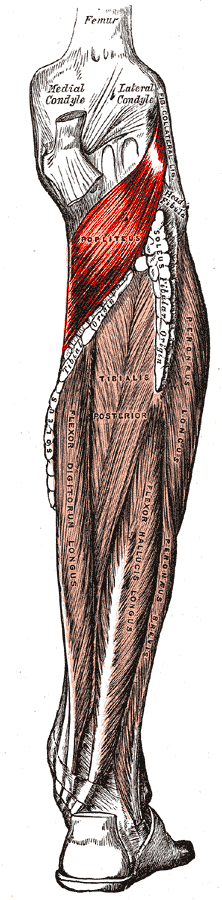
Deep layer of muscles on the back of the right leg

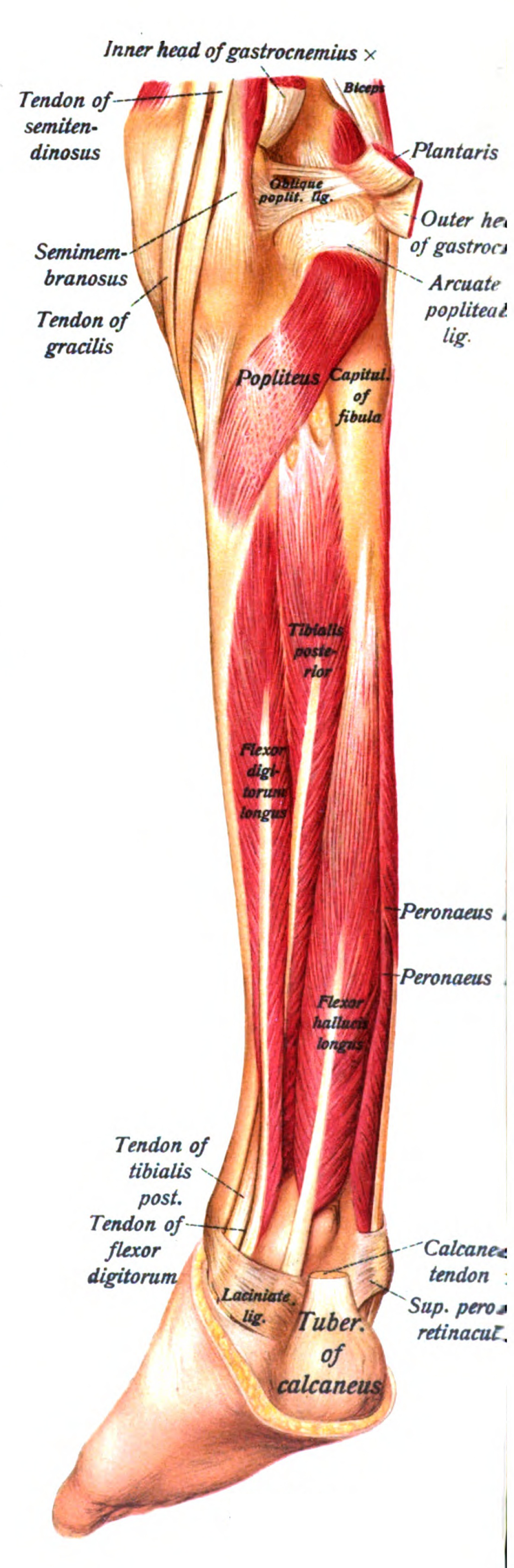
Muscles of deep posterior compartment of the right leg

== Surgery ==
Injury to the Popliteus causes posterolateral rotatory instability of knee. This can be treated with Arthroscopic Popliteus Sling reconstruction using the popliteus portal.

== See also ==
- Posterolateral knee
