= Posterior ligament of the head of the fibula =

Ligament of the knee

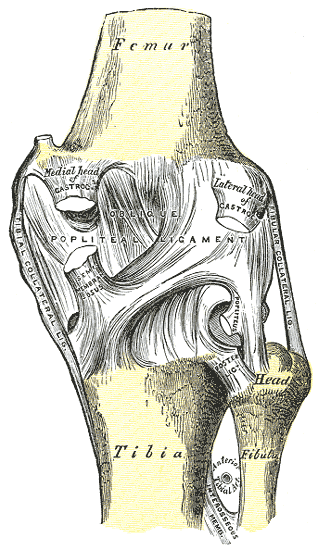
- Right knee-joint. Posterior view. (Post. lig. visible at center right, in white, near head of fibula.)

Details

Identifiers
- Latin: ligamentum capitis fibulae posterius
- TA98: A03.6.09.003
- TA2: 1911
- FMA: 76858

The posterior ligament of the head of the fibula is a part of the knee. It is a single thick and broad band, which passes obliquely upward from the back of the head of the fibula to the back of the lateral condyle of the tibia.

It is covered by the tendon of the popliteus.
