= Flexor hallucis longus muscle =

One of the three deep muscles in the lower leg

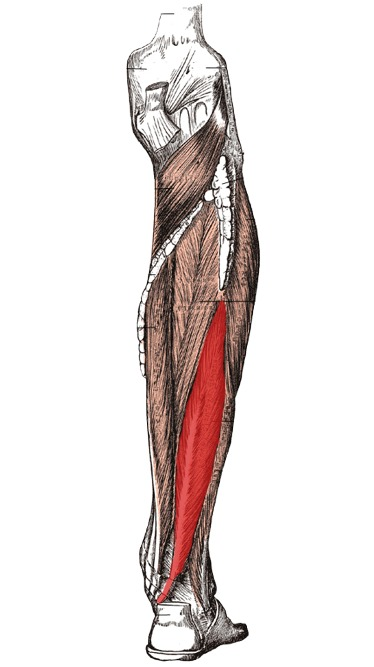
- Deep muscular layer of posterior compartment ot the right leg. Flexor hallucis longus is highlighted in red. (After Gray's Anatomy.)

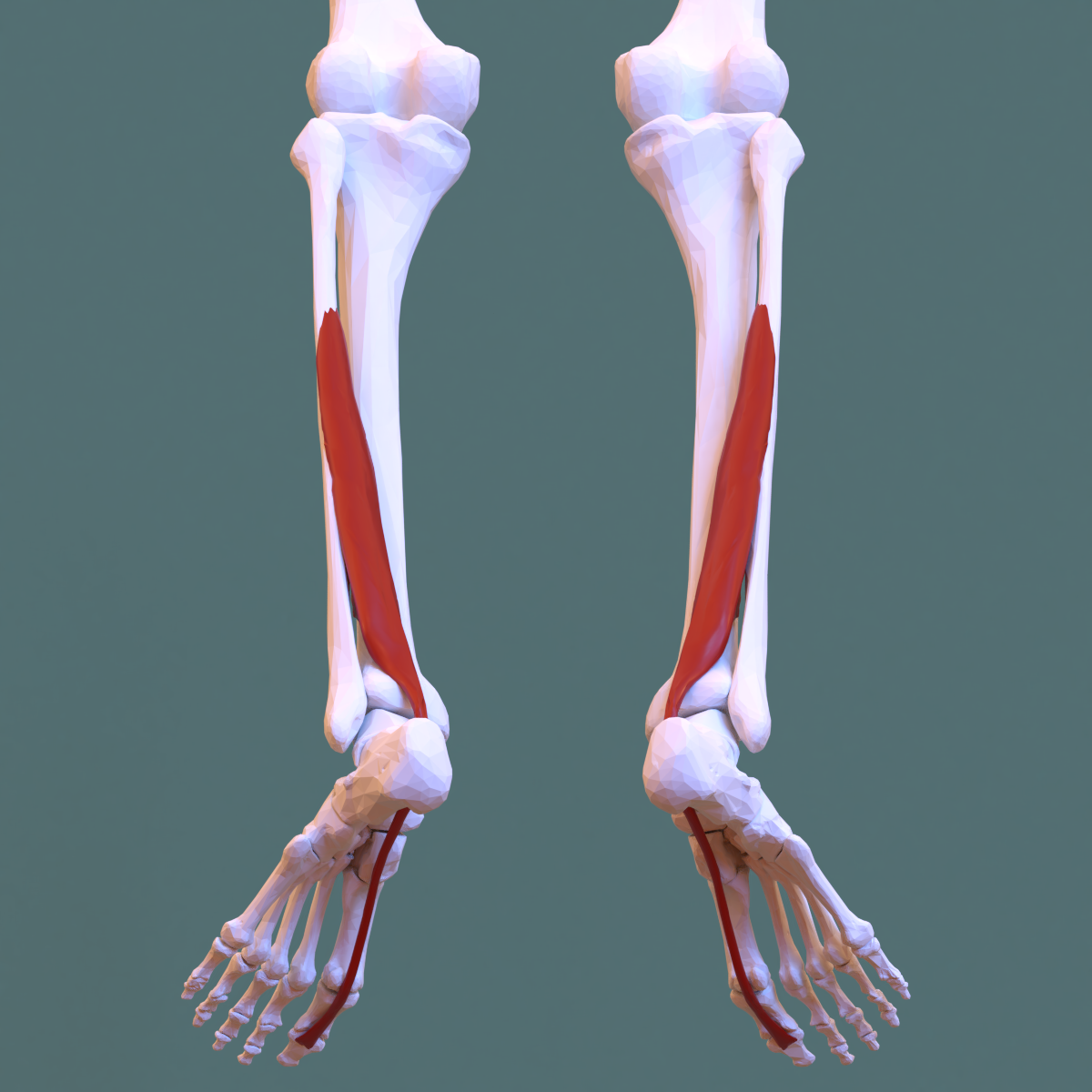
- Flexor hallucis longus. Seen from behind.

Details
- Origin: Fibula, posterior aspect of middle 1/3
- Insertion: Plantar surface; base of distal phalanx of hallux
- Artery: (Muscular branch of peroneal artery (peroneal branch of the posterior tibial artery)
- Nerve: Tibial nerve, S2 and S3
- Actions: Flexes all joints of the big toe, plantar flexion of the ankle joint
- Antagonist: Extensor hallucis longus muscle

Identifiers
- Latin: musculus flexor hallucis longus
- Acronym: FHL
- TA98: A04.7.02.053
- TA2: 2668
- FMA: 22593

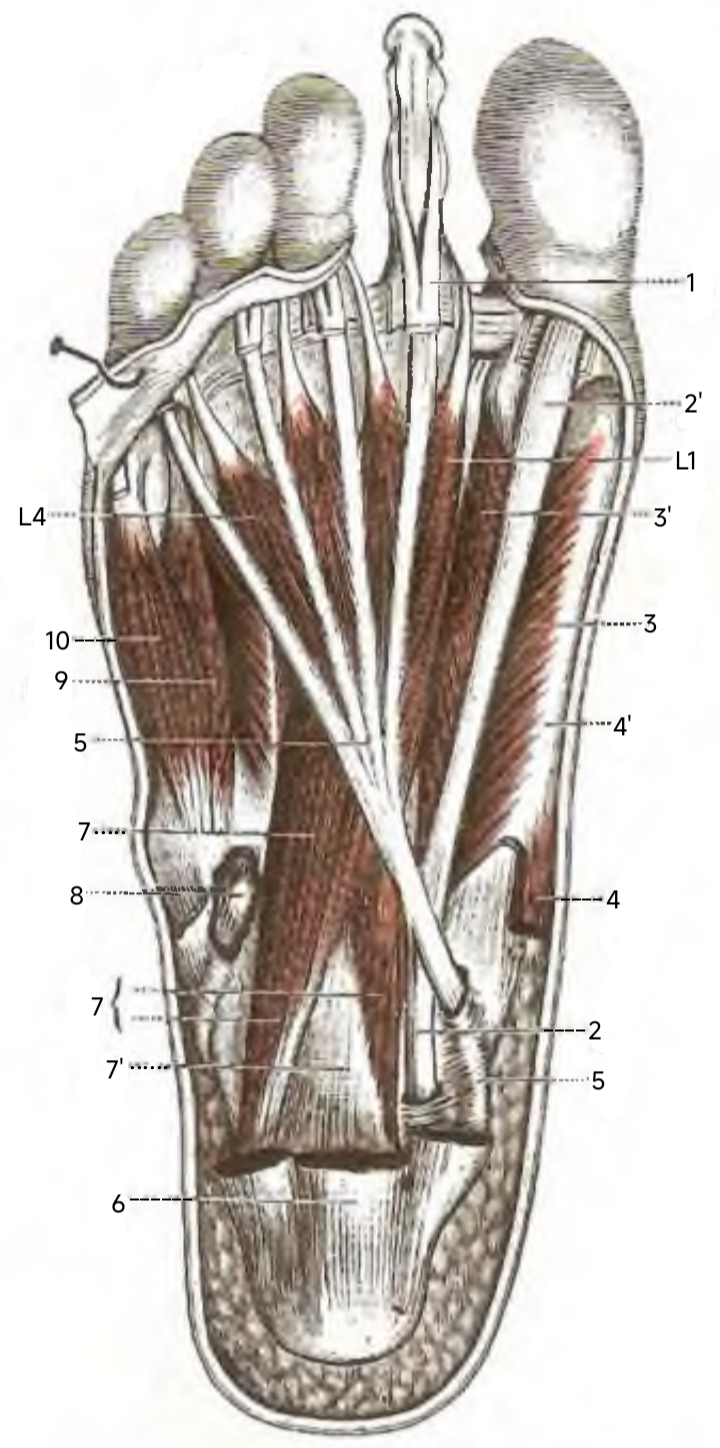
Tendon of the flexor hallucis longus (labeled 2, 2') and surrounding structures. Flexor digitorum longus tendon is labeled 5. Note the chiasma plantare. Right side, inferior view. (After Testut's Anatomy.)

The flexor hallucis longus muscle (FHL) attaches to the plantar surface of phalanx of the great toe and is responsible for flexing that toe. The FHL is one of the three deep muscles of the posterior compartment of the leg, the others being the flexor digitorum longus and the tibialis posterior. The tibialis posterior is the most powerful of these deep muscles. All three muscles are innervated by the tibial nerve which comprises half of the sciatic nerve.

== Structure ==
The flexor hallucis longus is situated on the fibular (lateral) side of the leg. It arises from the inferior two-thirds of the posterior surface of the body of the fibula, with the exception of 2.5 cm at its lowest part; from the lower part of the interosseous membrane; from an intermuscular septum between it and the peroneus muscles, laterally, and from the fascia covering the tibialis posterior, medially.

The fibers pass obliquely downward and backward, where it passes through the tarsal tunnel on the medial side of the foot and end in a tendon which occupies nearly the whole length of the posterior surface of the muscle.

This tendon lies in a groove which crosses the posterior surface of the lower end of the tibia, between the medial and lateral tubercles of the posterior surface of the talus, and the under surface of the sustentaculum tali of the calcaneus; in the sole of the foot it runs forward between the two heads of the flexor hallucis brevis, and is inserted into the base of the last phalanx of the great toe. The grooves on the talus and calcaneus, which contain the tendon of the muscle, are converted by tendinous fibers into distinct canals, lined by a mucous sheath.

As the tendon passes forward in the sole of the foot, it is situated above, and crosses from the lateral to the medial side of the tendon of the flexor digitorum longus (at the so-called chiasma plantare), to which it is connected by a fibrous slip.

=== Variation ===
Usually a slip runs to the flexor digitorum and frequently an additional slip runs from the flexor digitorum to the flexor hallucis. Peroneocalcaneus internus, rare, arises below or outside the flexor hallucis from the back of the fibula, passes over the sustentaculum tali with the flexor hallucis and inserts into the calcaneum.

== Function ==
Similar to the flexor digitorum longus and tibialis posterior muscles, the flexor hallucis longus muscle functions to plantar flex and invert the foot. However, it is unique in that it also functions to flex the great toe and helps supinate the ankle.

== Injury and treatment ==
Common injuries associated with the FHL tendon are tenosynovitis, tendinopathies, and muscle strains. Because the FHL muscle is small, injuries associated with this muscle and its tendon are often overlooked. An MRI can be used to evaluate the cause and condition of the FHL tendon. Tears and areas of impingement can be found using this method. A diagnostic ultrasound can also be used to diagnose FHL injuries, as it shows the muscle in movement and potential areas of impingement. Conservatively, an FHL injury can be evaluated by determining if movements caused by the FHL muscle cause pain along the inner ankle or under the big toe.

After passing through the tarsal tunnel, the flexor hallucis longus tendon must curve around a bony landmark called the sustentaculum tali. Friction at this site is likely to cause pain on the posteromedial aspect of the ankle. Colloquially referred to as "dancer's tendinitis," FHL tendinitis occurs commonly in ballet dancers, gymnasts, and even runners. Due to their excessive use of toe flexion, which results in ten times their body weight being applied to this small muscle and tendon, inflammation and irritation is common at the site of the sustentaculum tali.

Hallux saltans is a condition that develops as a result of overusing the FHL muscle. With this condition, a nodule develops along the FHL tendon which may produce a popping effect during contraction because it drags along surrounding tissues. If left untreated and continually irritated, stenosis of the tendon may occur, resulting in the big toe becoming stiff and relatively immobile. This condition is known as Hallux Rigidus.

Most FHL injuries can be managed through conservative treatment. Rest is usually the first indicated intervention for minor FHL injuries. Ice and ultrasound therapy can also help with the inflammation and pain. Physical therapy exercises and stretches can help rehabilitate the muscle and tendon and potentially address biomechanical errors that cause the inflammation and microtears in the tendon. Some FHL injuries can be treated through rest, physical therapy, splints, and anti-inflammatory medication. However, more serious or chronic injuries may require surgery. If surgery is indicated, tears in the FHL will be repaired, and debris will be removed from the area. An os trigonum may cause similar symptoms to the ones caused by FHL tendinitis or tenosynovitis. A radiograph should be taken to rule out this condition.

== Additional images ==
Animation. Flexor hallucis longus shown in red.

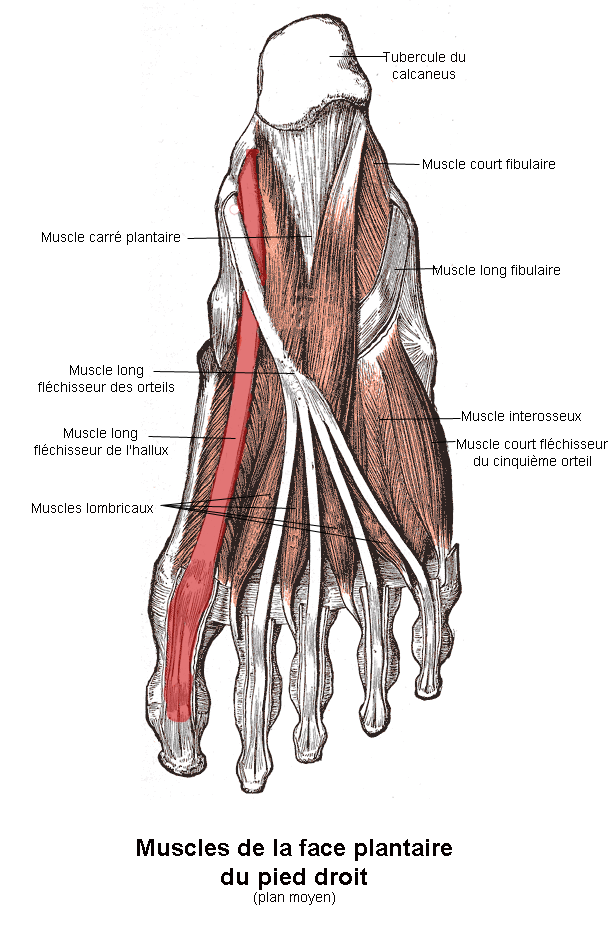
Muscles of the sole of the foot. Second layer.

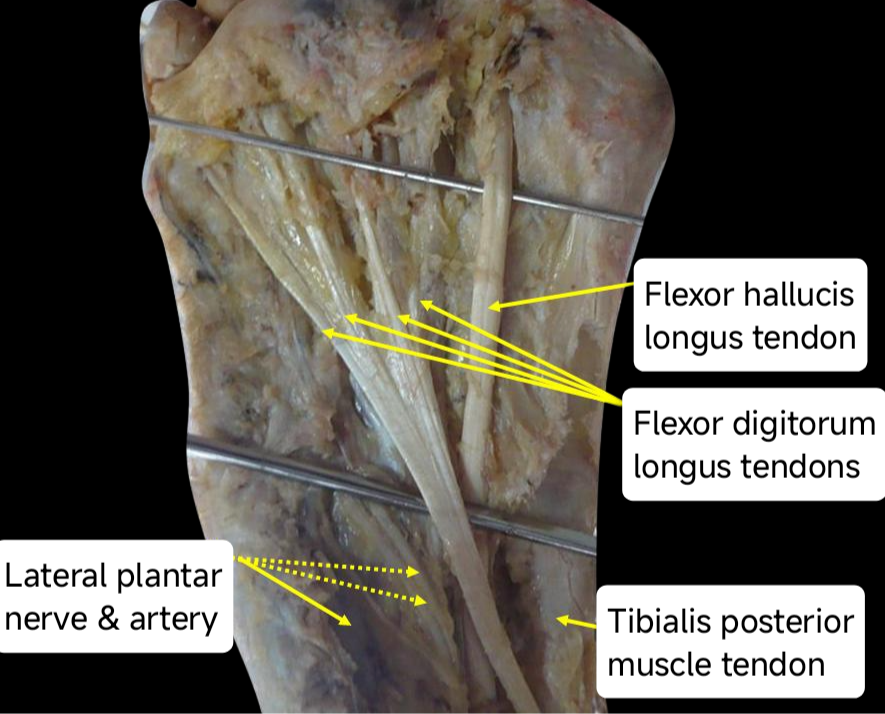
Anatomical piece showing flexor hallucis longus tendon, chiasma plantare (marked by lower probe), and surrounding anatomy. Right lower limb.
