= Anterior ligament of the head of the fibula =

Ligament of the calf bone and shinbone

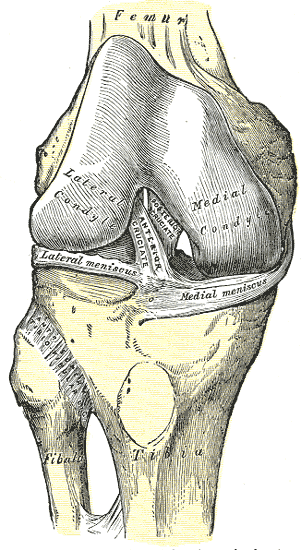
- Right knee-joint, from the front, showing interior ligaments. (Ant. super. tibio-fibular lig. labeled at center left, in white.)

Details
- From: fibula
- To: tibia

Identifiers
- Latin: ligamentum capitis fibulae anterius
- TA98: A03.6.09.002
- TA2: 1910
- FMA: 76857

The anterior ligament of the head of the fibula (anterior superior ligament) consists of two or three broad and flat bands, which pass obliquely upward from the front of the head of the fibula to the front of the lateral condyle of the tibia.

This fibrous band crosses obliquely and superiorly from the anterior aspect of the head of the fibula to the lateral condyle of the tibia. It merges with the fibrous capsule of the proximal tibiofibular joint and restrains its movements further.
