= Medial condyle of tibia =

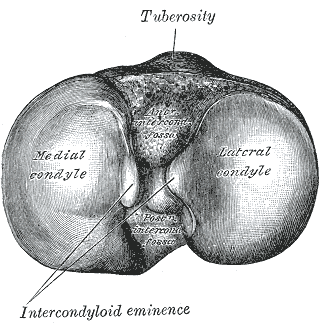
- Upper surface of right tibia. (Anterior is at top.)

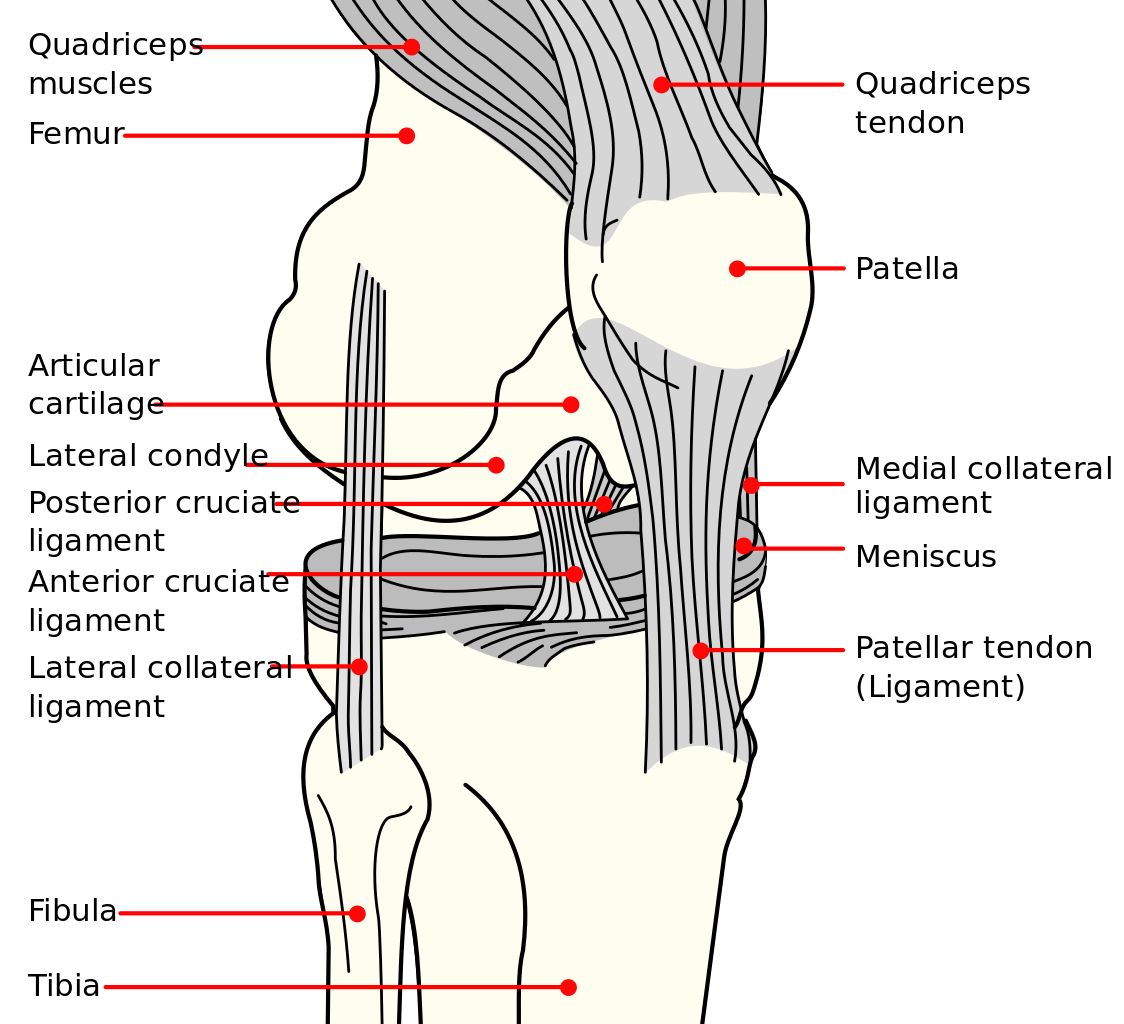

Details

Identifiers
- Latin: condylus medialis tibiae
- TA98: A02.5.06.003
- TA2: 1408
- FMA: 35445

The medial condyle is the medial (or inner) portion of the upper extremity of tibia.

It is the site of insertion for the semimembranosus muscle.

== See also ==
- Lateral condyle of tibia
- Medial collateral ligament

== Additional images ==
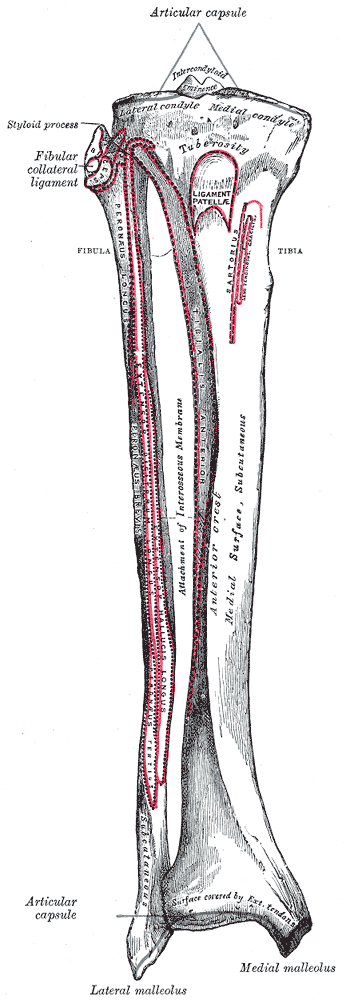
Bones of the right leg. Anterior surface.

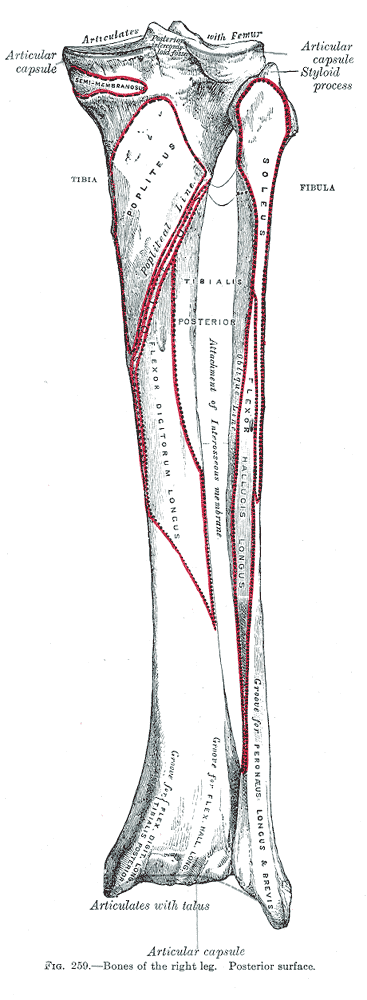
Bones of the right leg. Posterior surface.

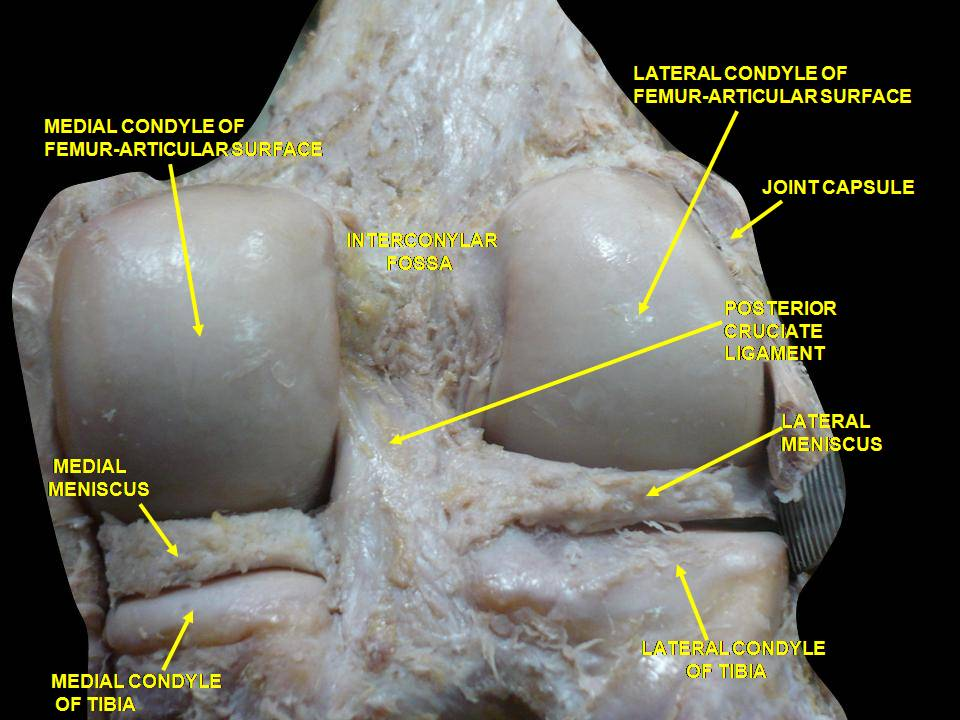
Right knee in extension. Deep dissection. Posterior view.

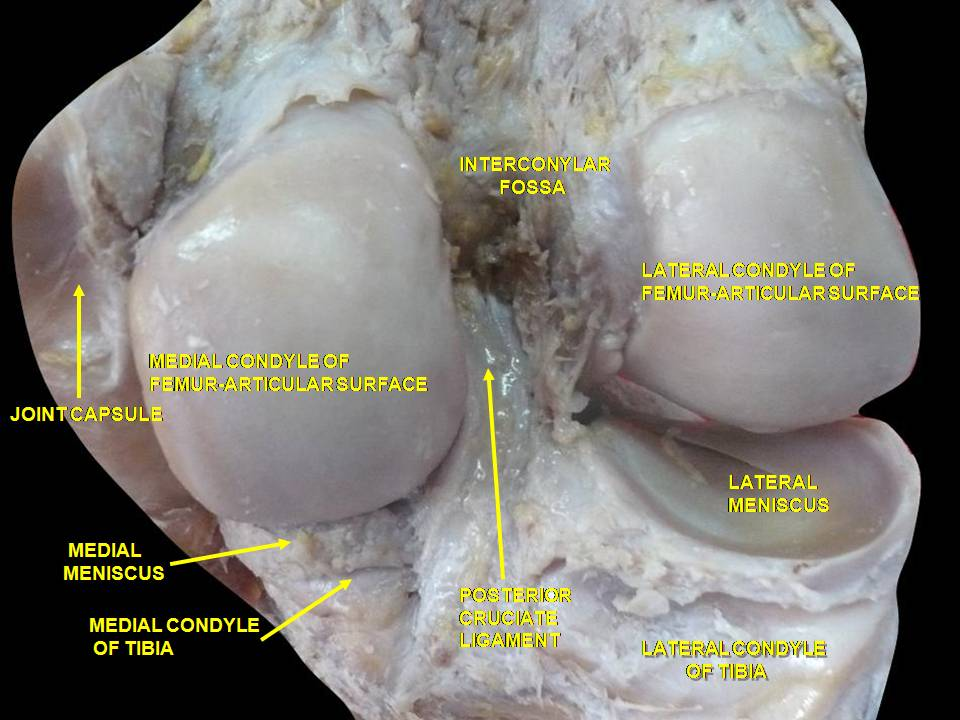
Right knee in extension. Deep dissection. Posterior view.
