= Tibialis posterior muscle =

Muscle in the most central of all the leg muscles

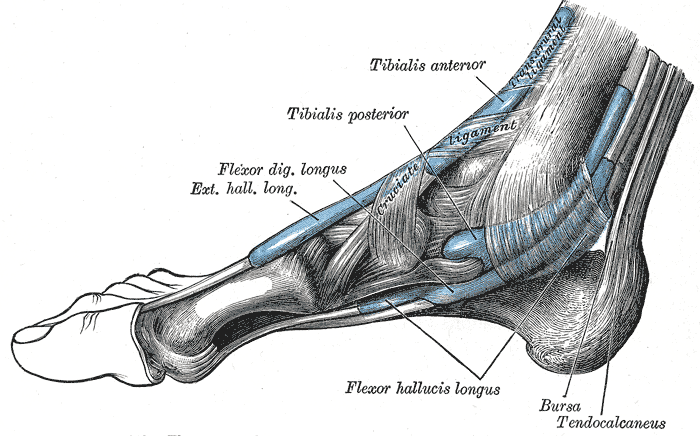
- The mucous sheaths of the tendons around the ankle. Medial aspect. (Tibialis posterior labeled at top center.)

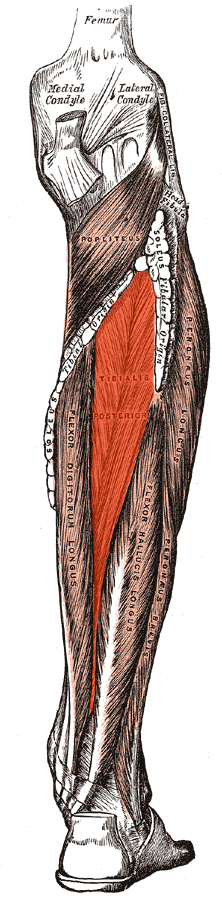
- Right-sided tibialis posterior muscle, highlighted in bright red. Posterior-lateral view. (After Gray's Anatomy.)

Details
- Origin: Tibia and fibula
- Insertion: Navicular and medial cuneiform bone
- Artery: Posterior tibial artery
- Nerve: Tibial nerve
- Actions: Inversion of the foot and plantar flexion of the foot at the ankle
- Antagonist: Fibularis brevis and longus, antagonist to the inversion

Identifiers
- Latin: musculus tibialis posterior
- TA98: A04.7.02.051
- TA2: 2666
- FMA: 51099

The tibialis posterior muscle is the most central of all the leg muscles, and is located in the deep posterior compartment of the leg. It is the key stabilizing muscle of the lower leg.

== Posterior tibial tendonitis ==
Posterior tibial tendonitis is a condition that predominantly affects runners and active individuals. It involves inflammation or tearing of the posterior tibial tendon, which connects the calf muscle to the bones on the inside of the foot. It plays a vital role in supporting the arch and assisting in foot movement. This condition can cause pain, swelling, and potentially lead to flatfoot if left untreated.

== Structure ==
The tibialis posterior muscle originates on the inner posterior border of the fibula laterally. It is also attached to the interosseous membrane medially, which attaches to the tibia and fibula.

The tendon of the tibialis posterior muscle (sometimes called the Posterior tibial tendon ) descends posterior to the medial malleolus. It terminates by dividing into plantar, main, and recurrent components. The main portion inserts into the tuberosity of the navicular bone. The smaller portion inserts into the plantar surface of the medial cuneiform (sin. first cuneiform). The plantar portion inserts into the bases of the second, third and fourth metatarsals, the intermediate (second) and lateral (third) cuneiforms and the cuboid. The recurrent portion inserts into the sustentaculum tali of the calcaneus.

Blood is supplied to the muscle by the posterior tibial artery.

=== Nerve supply ===
The tibialis posterior muscle is supplied by the tibial nerve.

== Function ==
The tibialis posterior muscle is a key muscle for stabilization of the lower leg. It also contracts to produce inversion of the foot, and assists in the plantarflexion of the foot at the ankle. The tibialis posterior has a major role in supporting the medial arch of the foot. Dysfunction of the tibialis posterior, including rupture of the tibialis posterior tendon, can lead to flat feet in adults, as well as a valgus deformity due to unopposed eversion when inversion is lost.

== Clinical significance ==
Injury to the distal tendon of the tibialis posterior muscle is rare. It may be caused during exercise. It usually presents with pain on the medial side of the ankle. Injuries including dislocations and tears often require surgery.

== Additional images ==
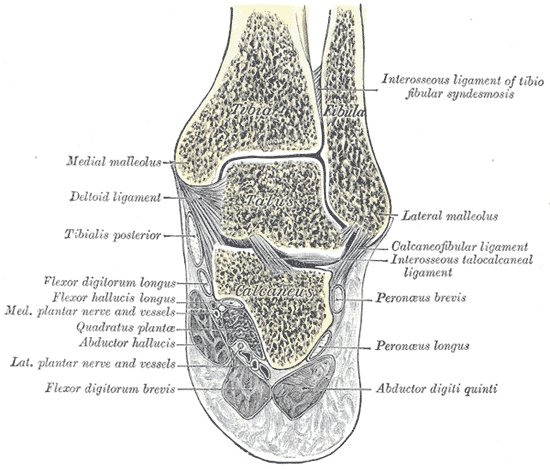
Coronal section through right talocrural and talocalcaneal joints.

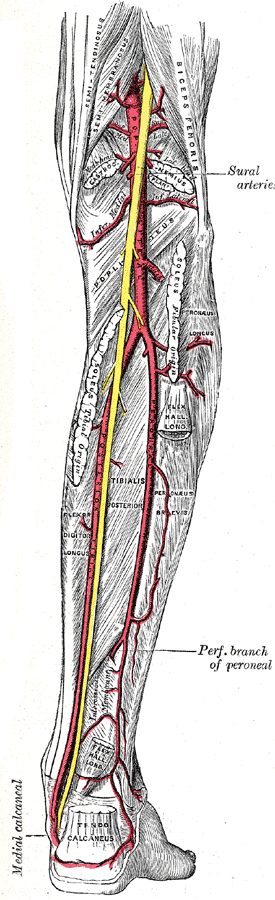
The popliteal, posterior tibial, and peroneal arteries.

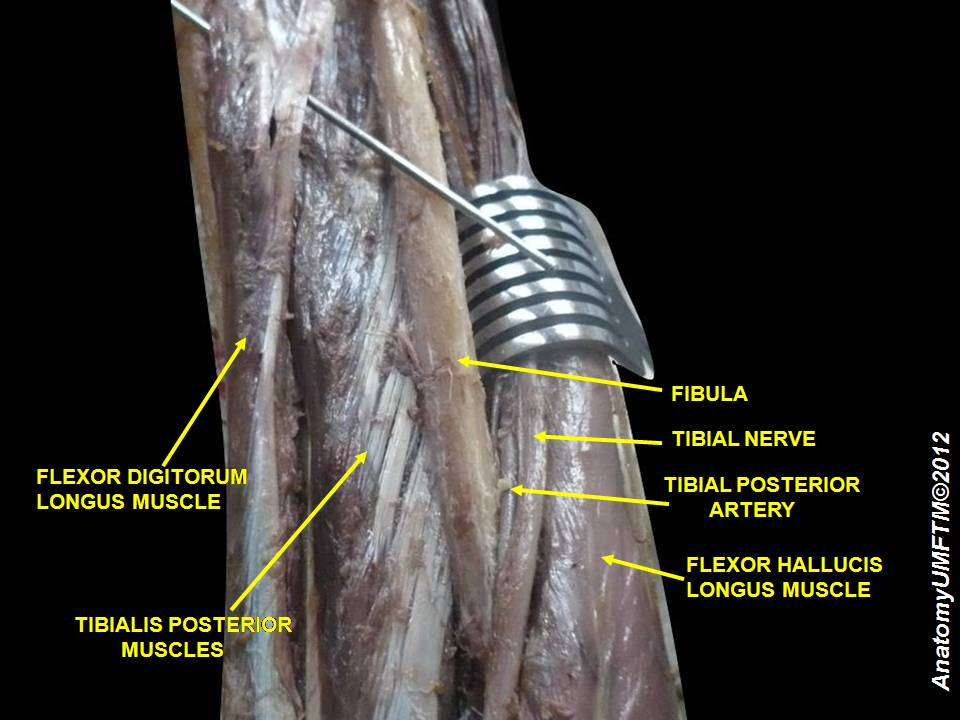
Muscles of the back of the leg. Deep layer.

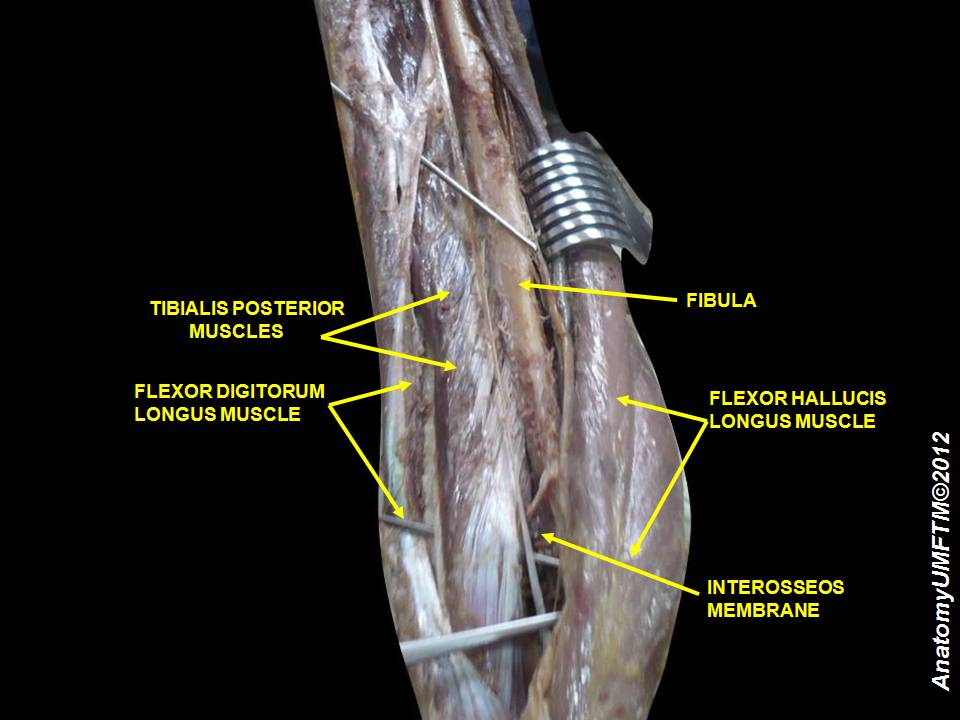
Muscles of the back of the leg. Deep layer.

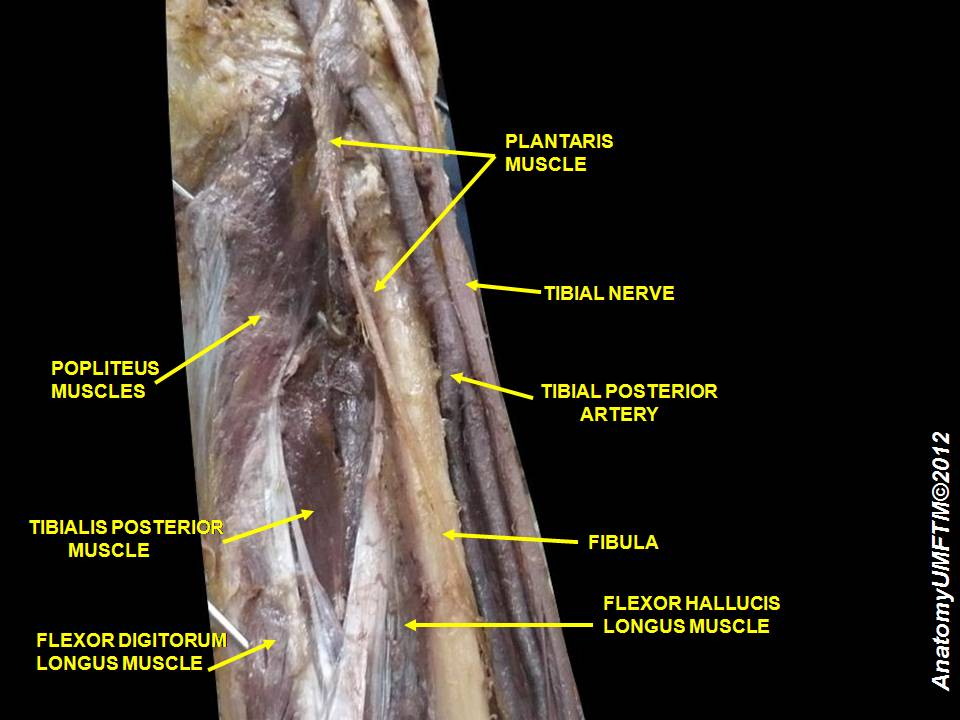
Muscles of the leg. Posterior view.

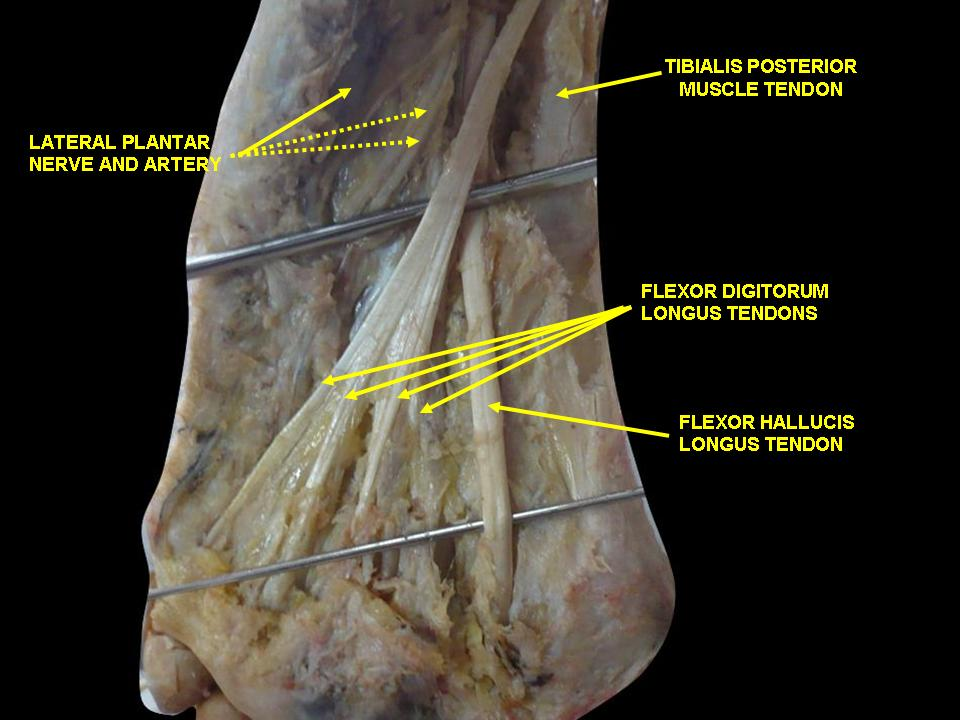
Muscles of the sole of the foot.

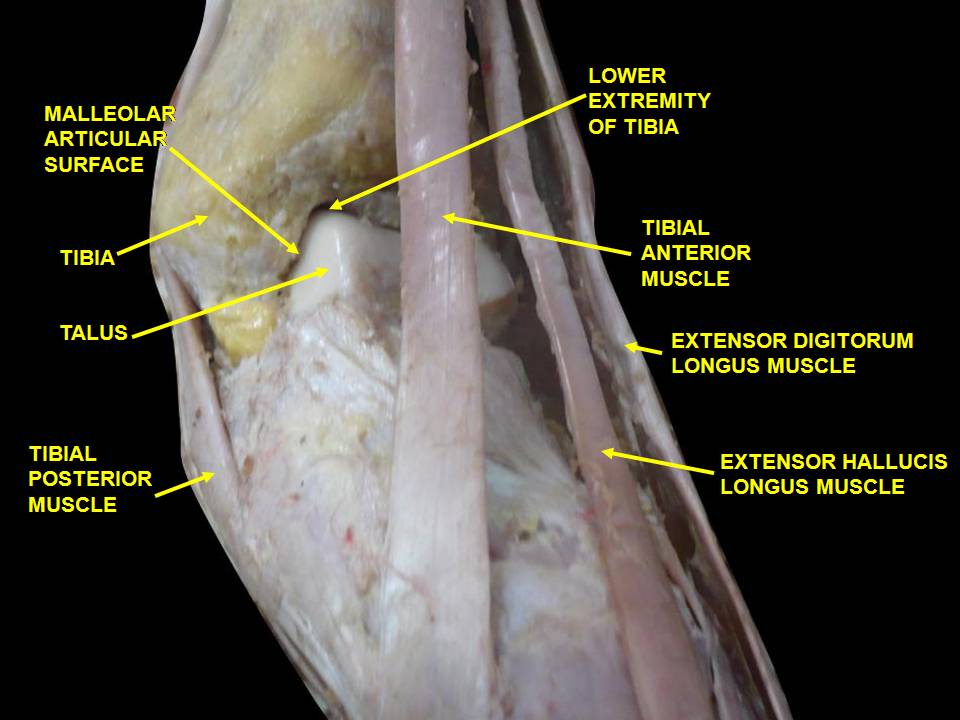
Dorsum of foot. Ankle joint. Deep dissection

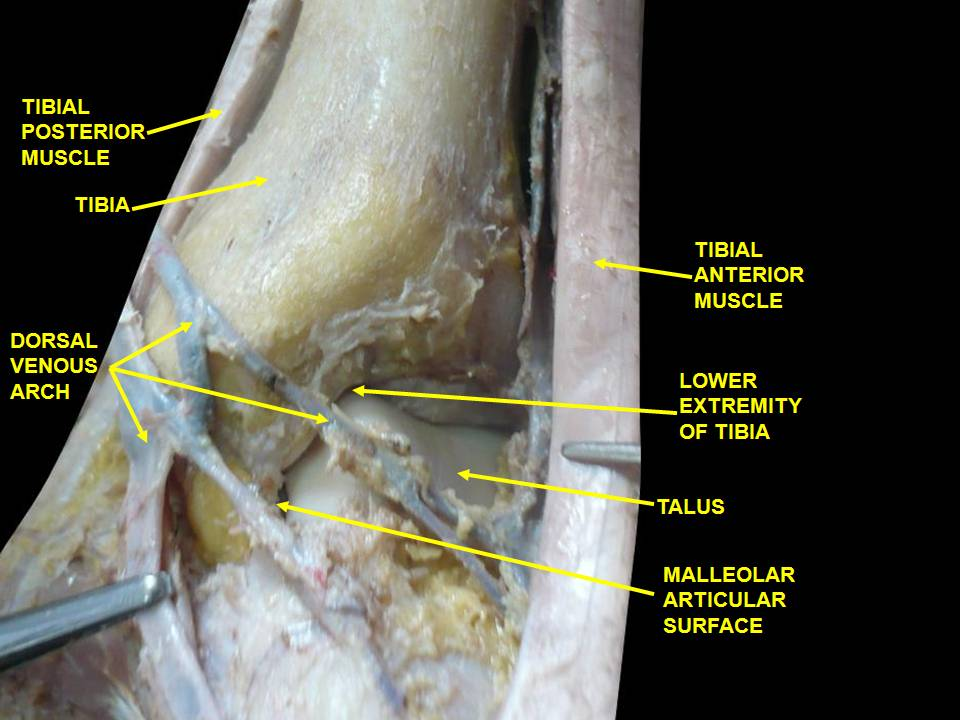
Dorsum of foot. Ankle joint. Deep dissection.

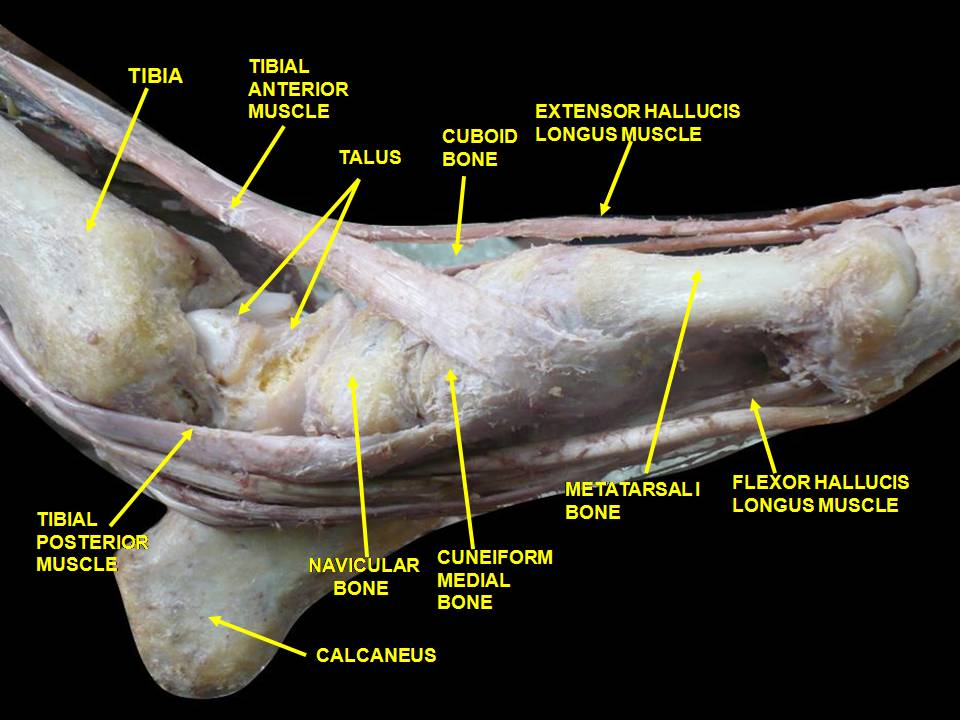
Ankle joint. Deep dissection. Medial view
