= Lateral condyle of tibia =

Lateral top surface of shinbone

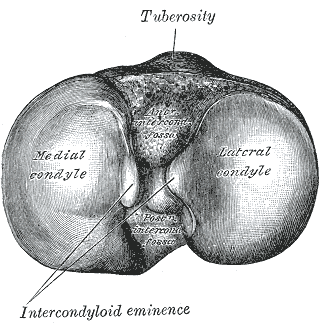
- Upper surface of right tibia. (Anterior is at top.)

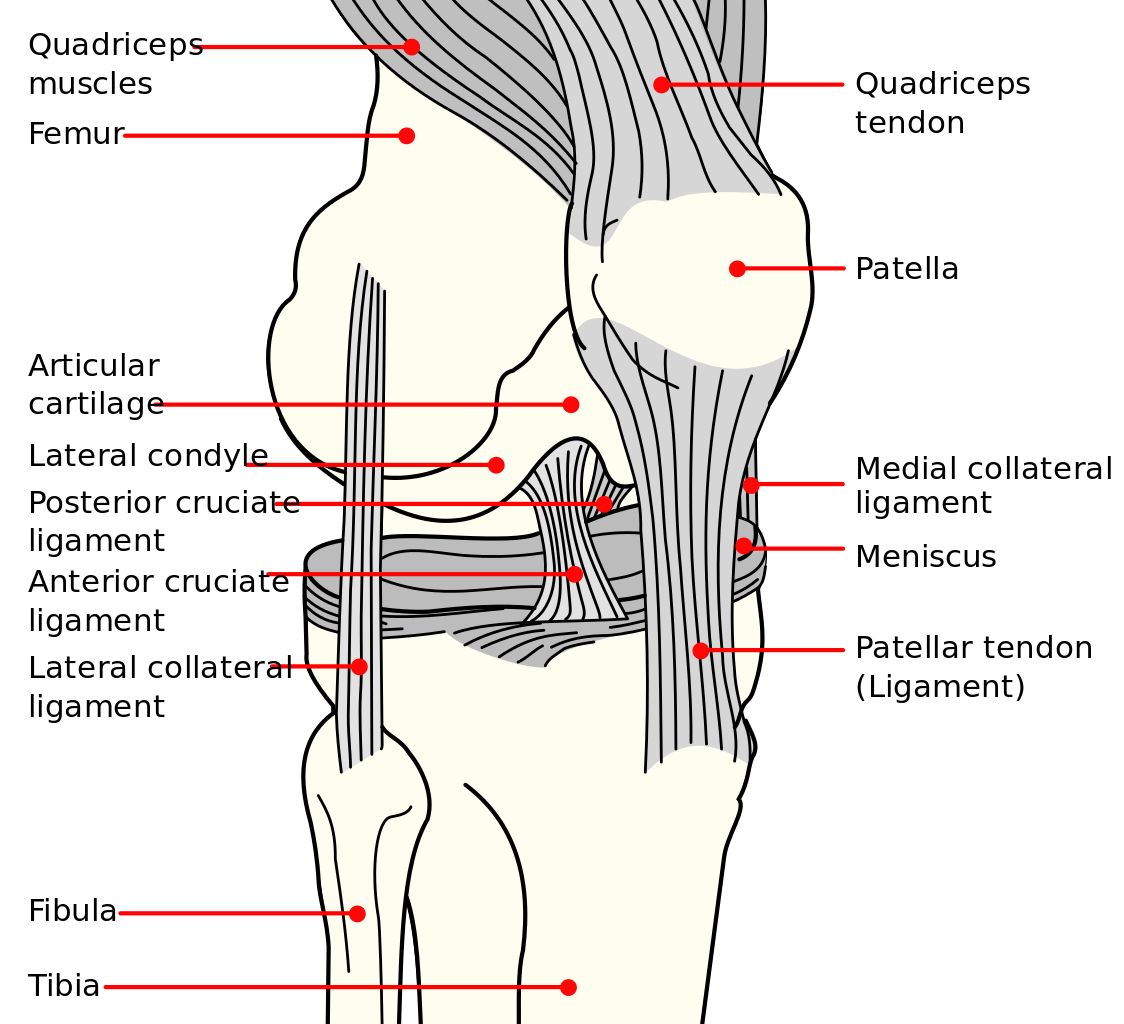

Details

Identifiers
- Latin: condylus lateralis tibiae
- TA98: A02.5.06.004
- TA2: 1409
- FMA: 35448

The lateral condyle is the lateral portion of the upper extremity of tibia.

It serves as the insertion for the biceps femoris muscle (small slip). Most of the tendon of the biceps femoris inserts on the fibula.

== See also ==
- Gerdy's tubercle
- Medial condyle of tibia

== Additional images ==
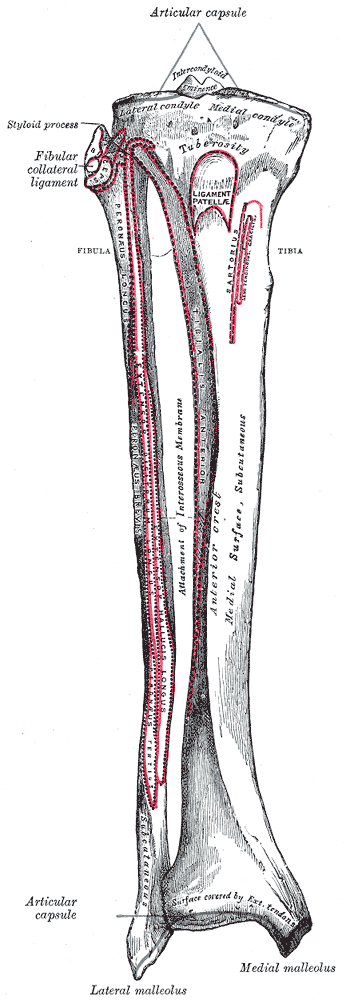
Bones of the right leg. Anterior surface.

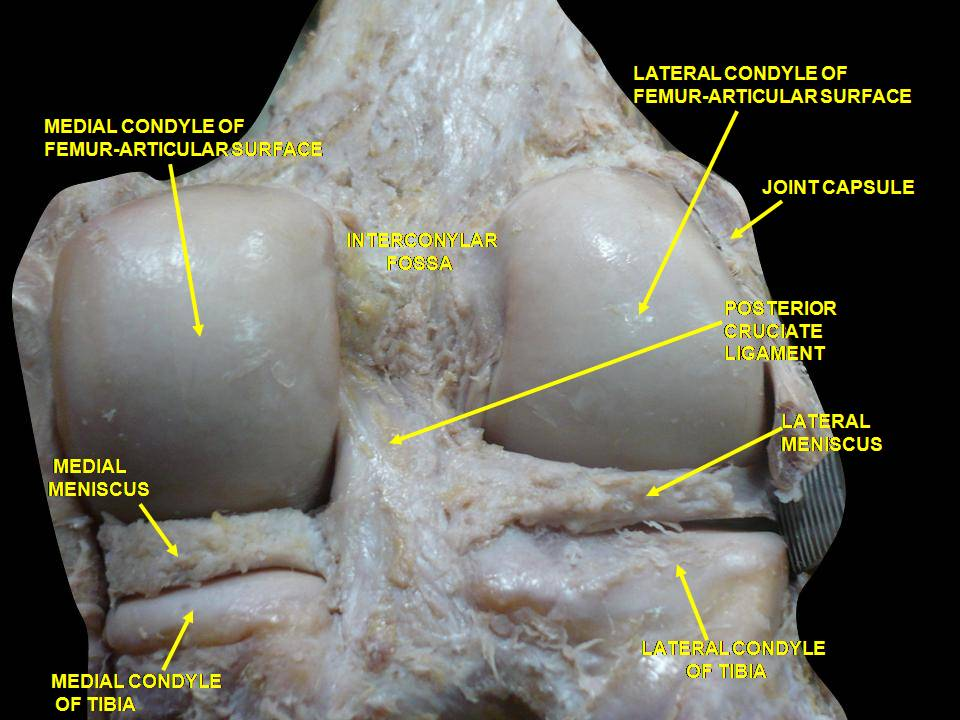
Right knee in extension. Deep dissection. Posterior view.

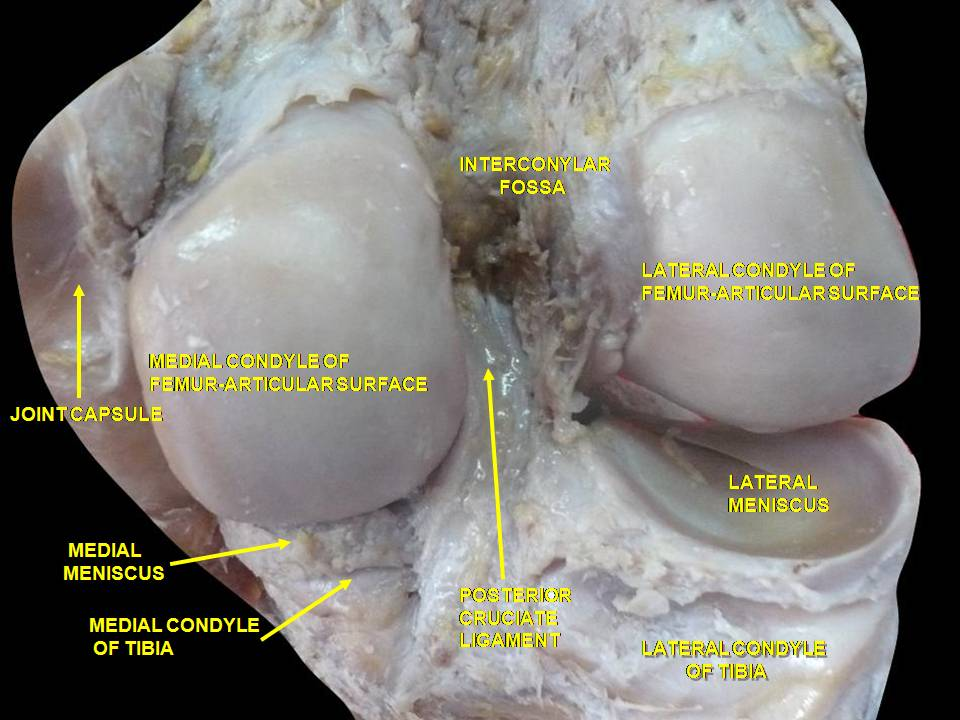
Right knee in extension. Deep dissection. Posterior view.
