= Tarsus (skeleton) =

Bones of the foot

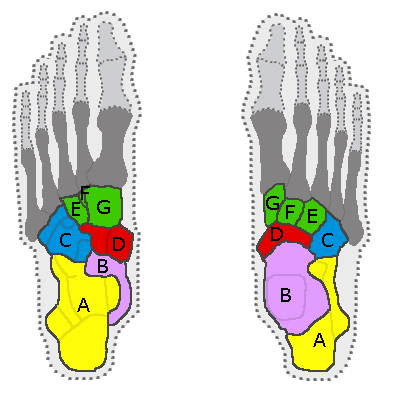
- Right foot bones, seen from below (left) and above (right). 7 bones constituting the tarsus: A: Calcaneus B: Talus bone C: Cuboid bone D: Navicular bone E, F, G: Cuneiform bones (Medial, Intermediate, Lateral)

- Bones constituting the tarsus. (same color scheme as above)

Details
- Part of: Foot

Identifiers
- Latin: ossa tarsi
- MeSH: D013639
- TA98: A02.5.09.001
- TA2: 1447
- FMA: 24491

In the human body, the tarsus (pl.: tarsi) is a cluster of seven articulating bones in each foot situated between the lower end of the tibia and the fibula of the lower leg and the metatarsus. It is made up of the midfoot (cuboid, medial, intermediate, and lateral cuneiform, and navicular) and hindfoot (talus and calcaneus).

The tarsus articulates with the bones of the metatarsus, which in turn articulate with the proximal phalanges of the toes. The joint between the tibia and fibula above and the tarsus below is referred to as the ankle joint proper.

In humans the largest bone in the tarsus is the calcaneus, which is the weight-bearing bone within the heel of the foot.

== Human anatomy ==
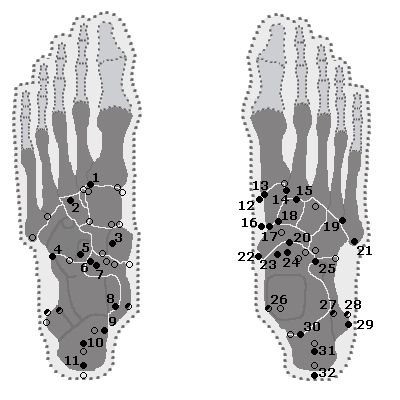
Location of accessory tarsal bones

=== Bones ===
The talus bone or ankle bone is connected superiorly to the two bones of the lower leg, the tibia and fibula, to form the ankle joint or talocrural joint; inferiorly, at the subtalar joint, to the calcaneus or heel bone. Together, the talus and calcaneus form the hindfoot.

The five irregular bones of the midfoot—the cuboid, navicular, and three cuneiform bones—form the arches of the foot which serves as a shock absorber. The midfoot is connected to the hind- and forefoot by muscles and the plantar fascia.

=== Movements ===
The complex motion of the subtalar joint occurs in three planes and produces subtalar inversion and eversion. Along with the transverse tarsal joint (i.e. talonavicular and calcaneocuboid joint), the subtalar joint transforms tibial rotation into forefoot supination and pronation. The axis of rotation in the joint is directed upward 42 degrees from the horizontal plane and 16 degrees medially from the midline of the foot. However, together, the subtalar facets form a screw or Archimedean spiral (right-handed in the right foot) about which subtalar motion occurs. So, during subtalar inversion, the calcaneus also rotates clockwise and translates forward along the axis of the screw. Average subtalar motion is 20-30 degrees inversion and 5-10 degrees eversion. Functional motion during the gait cycle is 10-15 degrees (the heel strikes the ground in slight inversion followed by quick eversion).

The talonavicular and calcaneocuboid joints (i.e. between the talus and navicular bones, and the calcaneus and cuboid bones) form the so-called transverse tarsal joint or Chopart's joint. It has two axes of motion. Inversion and eversion occur about a longitudinal axis oriented 15 degrees upward from the horizontal plane and 9 degrees medially from the longitudinal axis of the foot. Flexion and extension occur primarily about an oblique axis oriented 52 degrees upward from the horizontal plane and 57 degrees anteromedially (forward-inward). In vitro talonavicular motion is 7 degrees flexion-extension and 17 degrees pronation-supination; while calcaneocuboid motion is 2 degrees flexion-extension and 7 degrees pronation-supination.

The motions of the subtalar and transverse talar joints interact to make the foot either flexible or rigid. With the subtalar joint in eversion, the two joints of the transverse joint are parallel, which make movements in this joint possible. With the subtalar joint in inversion, the axes of the transverse joint are convergent, movements in this joint are thus locked and the midfoot rigid.

== Other animals ==
In primitive tetrapods, such as Trematops, the tarsus consists of three rows of bones. There are three proximal tarsals, the tibiale, intermedium, and fibulare, named for their points of articulation with the bones of the lower limb. These are followed by a second row of four bones, referred to as the centralia (singular: centrale), and then a row of five distal tarsals, each articulating with a single metatarsal. In the great majority of tetrapods, including all of those alive today, this simple pattern is modified by the loss and fusion of some of the bones.

In reptiles and mammals, there are normally just two proximal tarsals, the calcaneus (equivalent to the amphibian fibulare) and the talus (probably derived from a fusion of multiple bones). In mammals, including humans, the talus forms a hinge joint with the tibia, a feature especially well developed in the artiodactyls. The calcaneus is also modified, forming a heel for the attachment of the Achilles tendon. Neither of these adaptations is found in reptiles, which have a relatively simple structure to both bones.

The fifth distal tarsal disappears relatively early in evolution, with the remainder becoming the cuneiform and cuboid bones. Reptiles usually retain two centralia, while mammals typically have only one (the navicular).

In birds, the tarsus has disappeared, with the proximal tarsals having fused with the tibia, the centralia having disappeared, and the distal bones having fused with the metatarsals to form a single tarsometatarsus bone, effectively giving the leg a third segment.

== Additional images ==
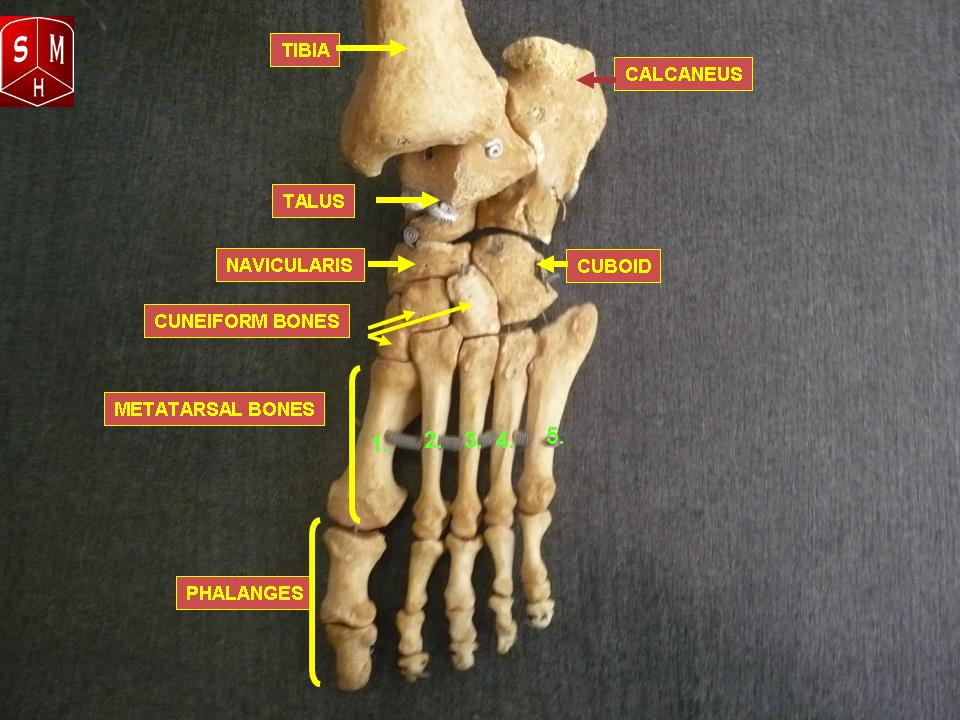
Foot bones - tarsus, metatarsus and phalanges.

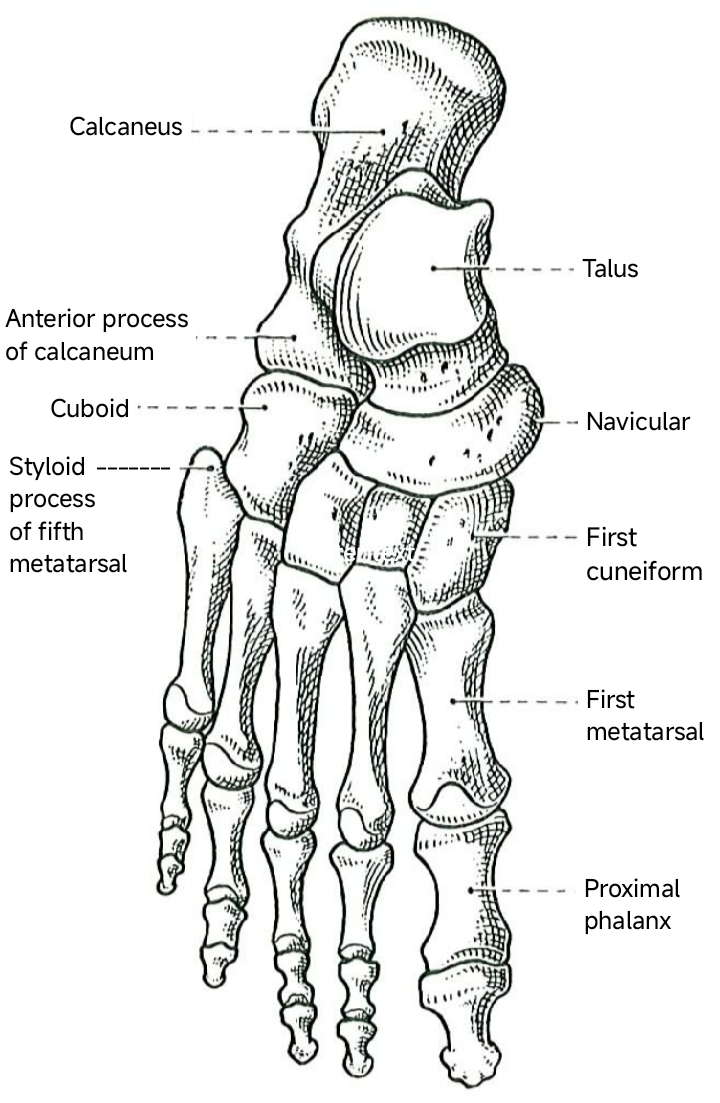
Bones of the right foot. Dorsal (superior) surface. (After Charpy.)

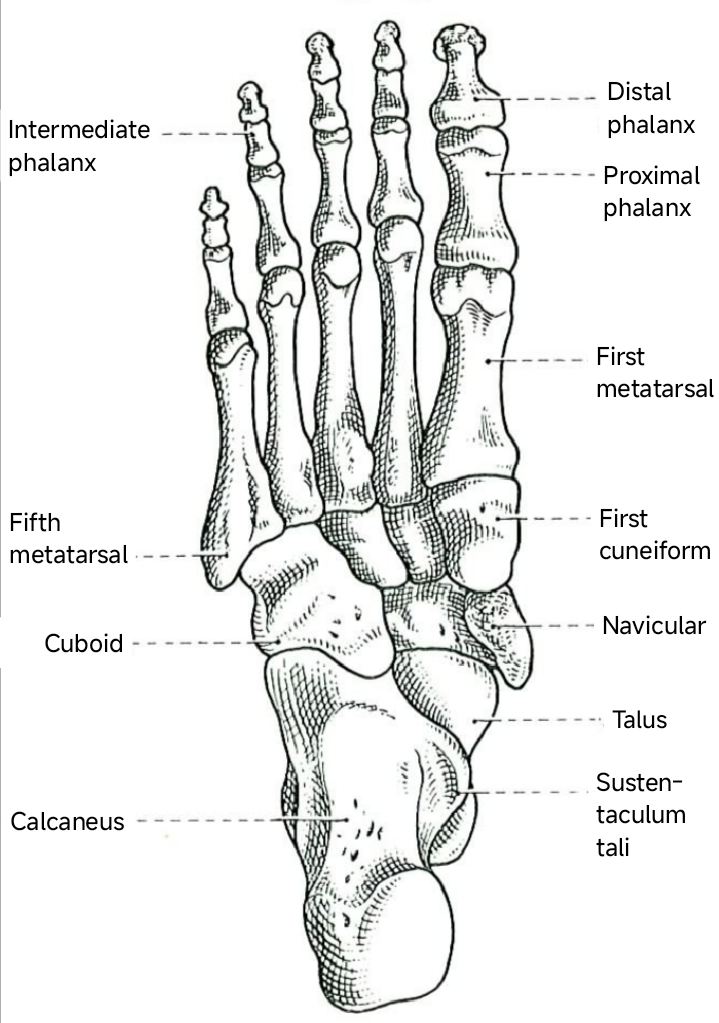
Inferior (plantar) view of the right foot skeleton. (After Charpy.)

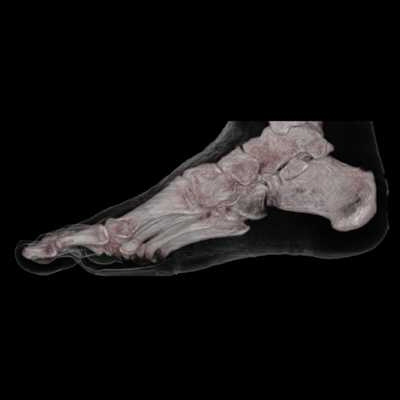
CT 3D human Foot Skin and Bone

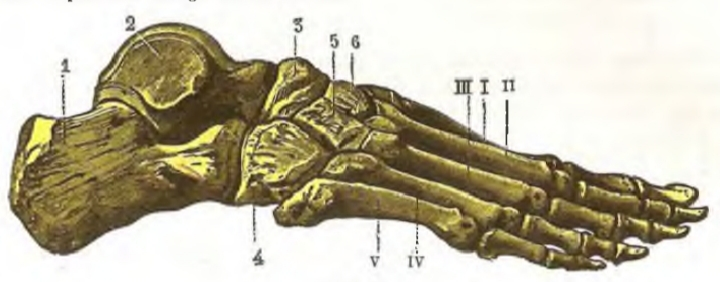
Skeleton of the right foot; lateral view. (After Testut's Anatomy.)

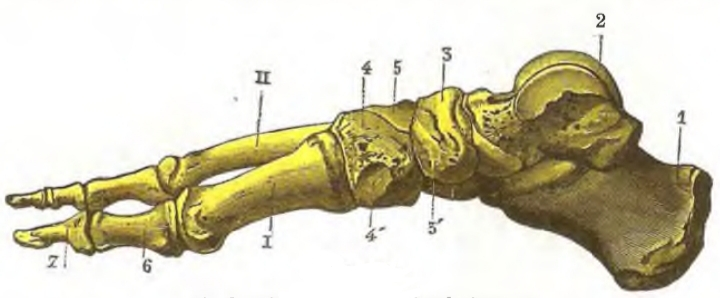
Skeleton of the right foot; medial view. (After Testut's Anatomy.)

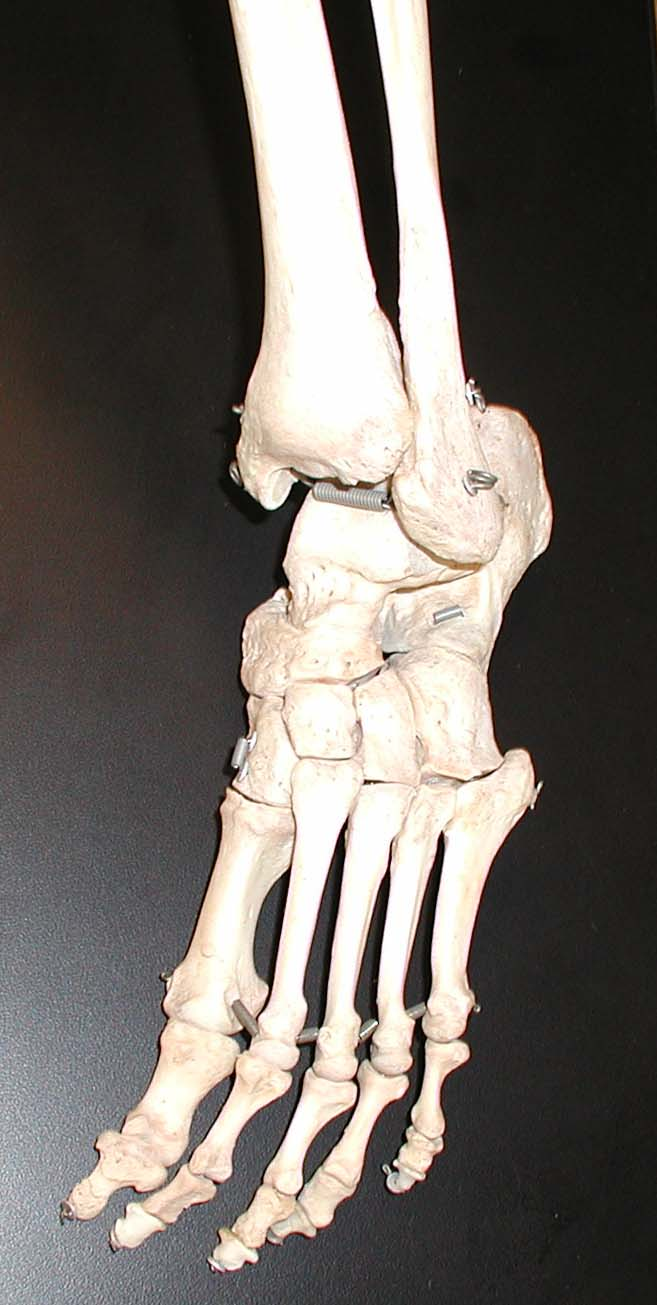
Bones of the feet from an actual skeleton.

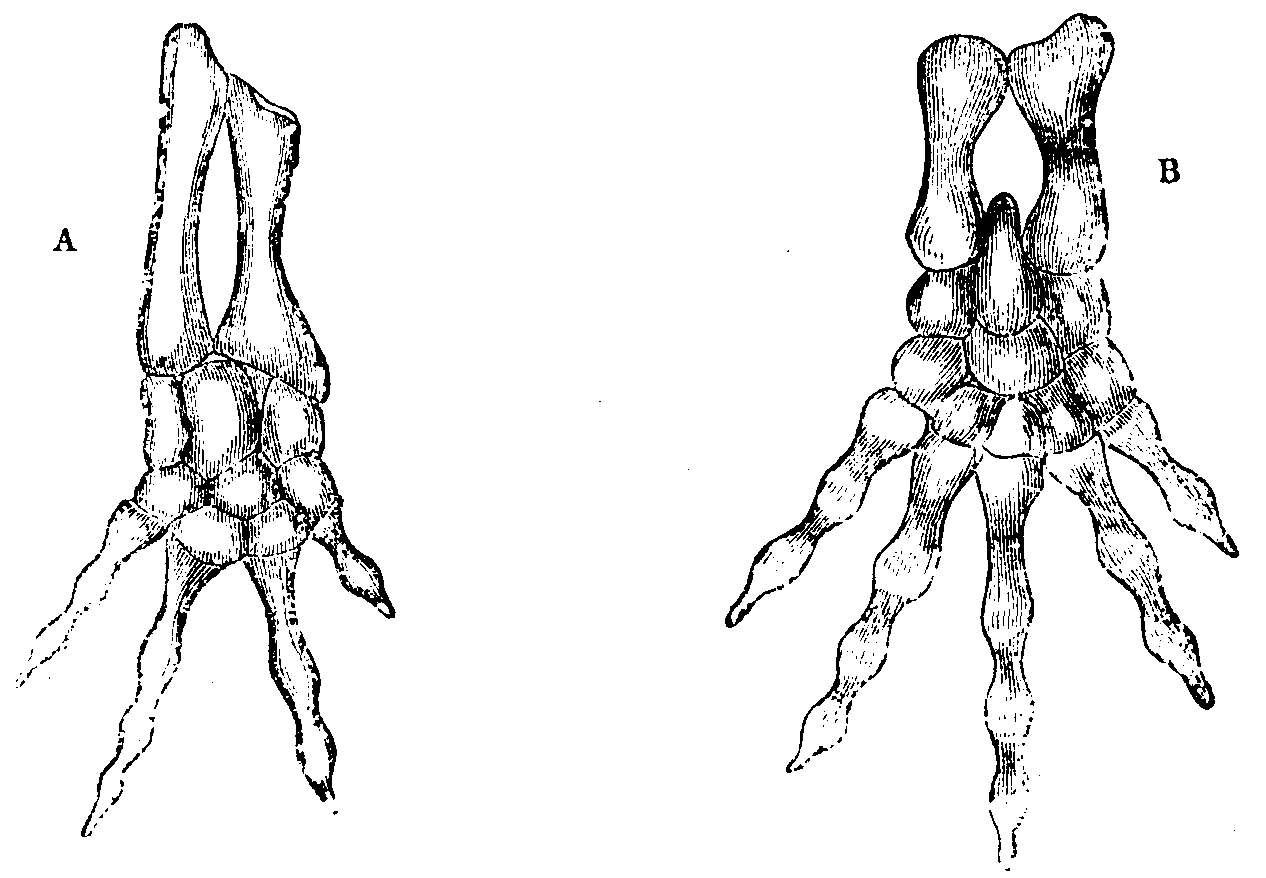
Skeleton of Manus and Pes of a Tailed Batrachian (from Professor Gegenbaur's "Tarsus and Carpus").

Bones of foot

== See also ==
- Arches of the foot
- Carpus
- Cuboid syndrome
- Tarsal tunnel
- Tarsal tunnel syndrome
