= Friedrich Albin Hoffmann =

German internist (1843–1924)

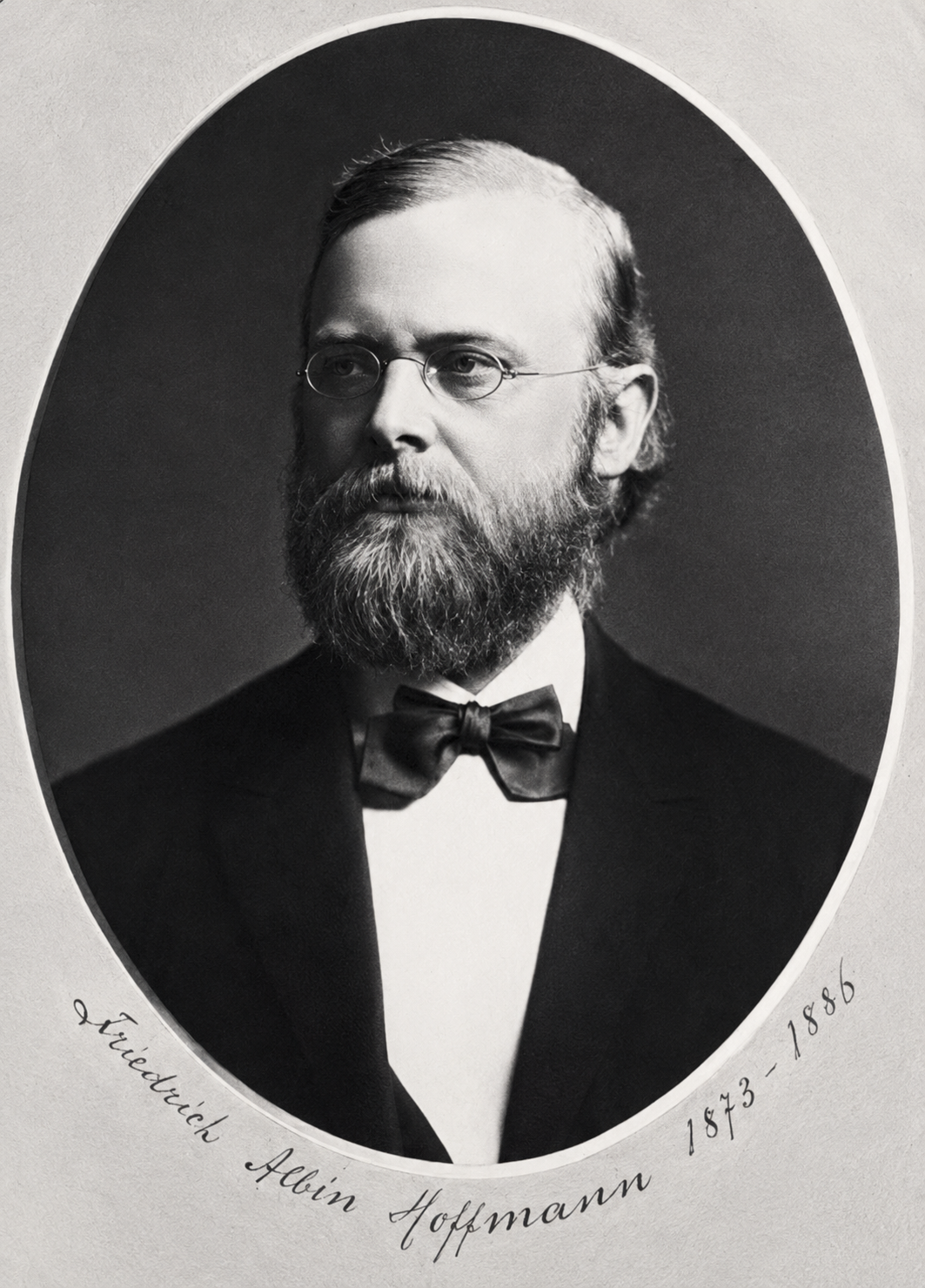
- Born: 13 November 1843; Ruhrort
- Died: 13 November 1924 (aged 81); Leipzig, Germany

Friedrich Albin Hoffmann (13 November 1843 – 13 November 1924) was a German internist and histologist. He was professor of internal medicine at the University of Dorpat, and professor and director of the Medical Polyclinic at Leipzig University for 34 years.

Hoffmann is remembered for early histological research carried out in the laboratory of Rudolf Virchow that contributed to the later concept of the reticuloendothelial system, and as an influential clinical teacher and diagnostician who was among the first German chair-holders to introduce X-ray diagnostics into internal medicine.

== Education and early career ==
The son of the counciller of justice and notary Carl Albin Hoffmann studied medicine between 1864 and 1869 at the universities of Berlin, Tübingen and Würzburg, graduating with a doctorate in 1868 for a histological thesis on contractile processes in the anterior epithelium of the frog cornea. He then became an assistant to Friedrich Theodor von Frerichs (1819–1885) at the First Medical Clinic of the University of Berlin. In Virchow's laboratory Hoffmann worked with his contemporary Paul Langerhans (1847–1888) on the fate of cinnabar (mercury sulfide) injected intravenously into rabbits and guinea pigs. The two showed that the pigment was taken up by white blood cells but not by red blood cells, and that it accumulated in fixed cells of the bone marrow, in the connective tissue of the liver and in the capillary endothelium. These observations were among the pioneering studies later drawn upon by Ludwig Aschoff in formulating the concept of the reticuloendothelial (mononuclear phagocyte) system.

== Dorpat and military service ==
After serving in the Franco-Prussian War of 1870–71, Hoffmann habilitated in 1872 for special pathology and therapy (internal medicine). In 1874 he was appointed full professor of internal medicine at the Imperial University of Dorpat (now Tartu, Estonia). During the Russo-Turkish War (1877–1878) he directed a medical unit and was appointed a Russian Wirklicher Staatsrat (Actual State Councillor).

== Leipzig ==
In 1886 Hoffmann succeeded Adolf von Strümpell as professor of internal medicine at Leipzig and director of the university's Medical Polyclinic, a post he held until 1920. Over his long tenure he greatly enlarged the polyclinic, which became one of the largest in Germany; he described its organisation in a chapter written for the university's 500th-anniversary Festschrift in 1909.

== Scientific and clinical work ==
Hoffmann was regarded as a skilled diagnostician who applied histological methods to internal medicine. His clinical interests centred on diseases of the bronchi and lungs, the mediastinum, and disorders of the blood and metabolism; he contributed the volume on diseases of the bronchi, lungs and pleura to Nothnagel's encyclopaedia of practical medicine, which also appeared in an English translation in the United States. He was one of the first German professors of internal medicine to promote radiological diagnosis in the clinic, publishing an atlas of the radiographic anatomy of the mediastinum in 1909. His career reflects the transition from 19th-century pathological anatomy to 20th-century diagnostic internal medicine: histology, radiology, metabolism, constitutional disease, and social medicine all were integrated in his professional profile. At Leipzig, his long directorship made the Medical Polyclinic an influential training environment for generations of physicians.

Hoffmann attached particular therapeutic importance to diet, publishing on milk diets and dietetic cures. He was also cited in the contemporary debate over Hermann Oppenheim's concept of "traumatic neurosis" as one of the first authors to connect the condition to the new statutory accident insurance system, an early sociogenic reading of illness.

== Family ==
Hoffmann's son was the neurophysiologist and Nobel prize nominee Paul Hoffmann (1884–1962), known for the Hoffmann reflex (H-reflex) and the Hoffmann(-Tinel) sign.

== Selected writings ==
- Ueber Contractilitätsvorgänge im vorderen Epithelium der Froschhornhaut, Berlin 1868. (graduate thesis)
- Experimental-Studien über Diabetes, Berlin 1874. (with Carl Alfred Bock) - Experimental studies on diabetes.
- Betrachtungen über absolute Milchdiät, Berlin 1884 - Reflections on an absolute milk diet.
- Lehrbuch der Constitutionskrankheiten, Stuttgart 1893.
- Erkrankungen des Mediastinums, Vienna 1896. Diseases of the mediastinum.
- Die Reichsversicherungsordnung nach der Vorlesung über soziale Medizin für Juristen und Ärzte, Leipzig 1921.
