= Paul Albin Hoffmann =

German neurophysiologist (1884–1962)

- Born: 1 July 1884; Dorpat, Estonia
- Died: 9 March 1962 (aged 77)
- Education: University of Leipzig; University of Marburg; University of Berlin
- Known for: Describing Hoffmann's sign for assessment of nerve regeneration and success of nerve sutures. Discovery of the H-Reflex, an electrically induced spinal reflex used to assess the integrity of sensory and motor pathways.
- Scientific career
- Fields: Neurophysiology
- Workplaces: University of Würzburg; Director of Institute of Physiology at University of Freiburg-im-Breisgau

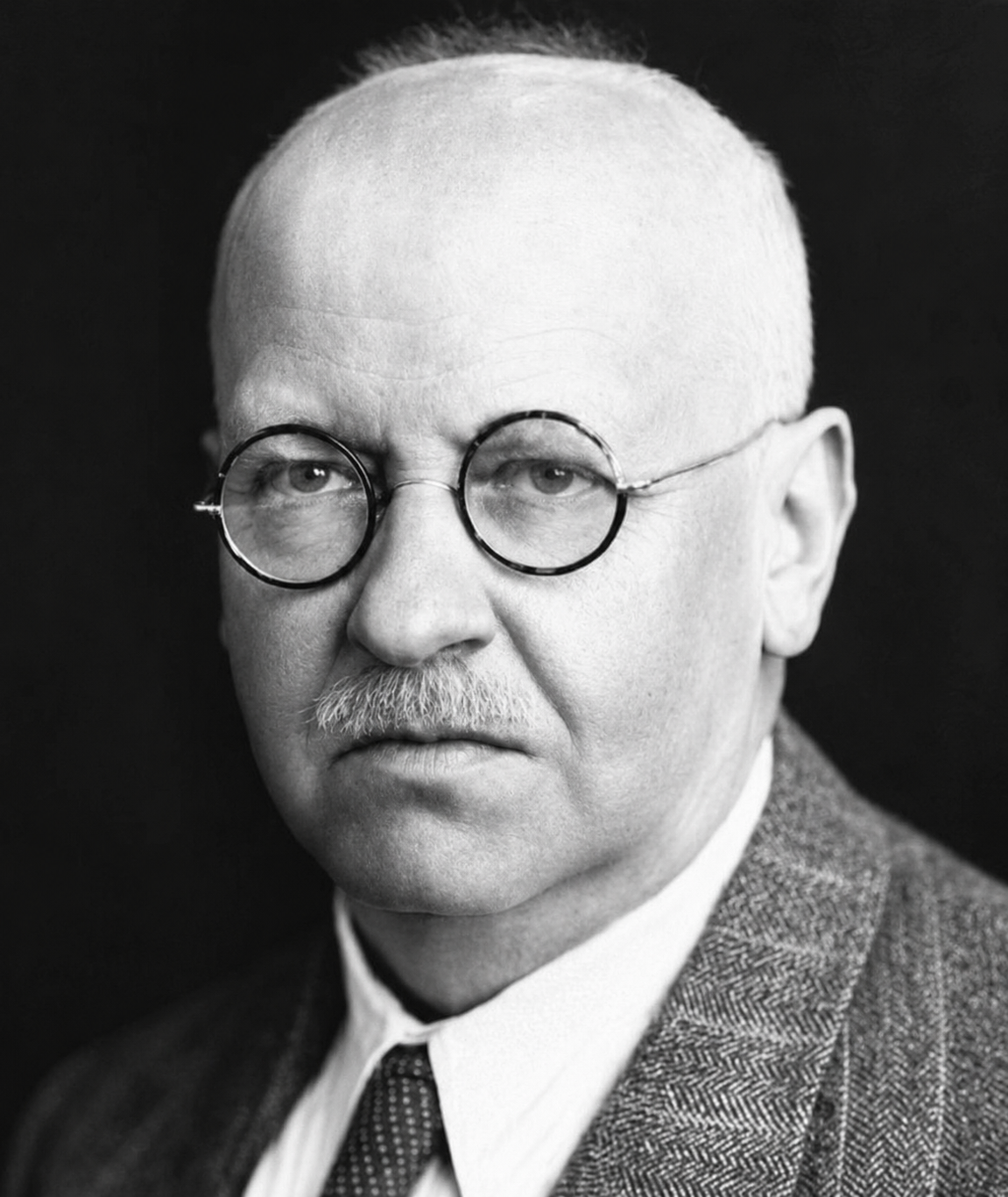
Paul Albin Hoffmann (1884-1962)

Paul Albin Hoffmann (July 1, 1884 – March 9, 1962) was a German neurophysiologist and professor of medicine, mainly known for describing the Hoffmann(-Tinel) sign and discovering the H-Reflex.

== Medical career ==
Hoffmann was born in Dorpat, Governorate of Estonia, where his father was professor in Internal Medicine at the University hospital. He went on to study medicine at the Universities of Leipzig, Marburg and Berlin in Germany from where he received his medical degree in 1909. In 1911, he was appointed as an assistant to Max von Frey at Würzburg University. He published thirty-two articles prior to the beginning of World War I, and during the war, he worked for several German field hospitals in France and the military hospital at Würzburg.

His early worked mainly focused on nerve action potentials and electrophysiology of nerves. He was a prolific writer and researcher, and has been hailed by some as father of modern German neurophysiology. In 1917, he was appointed as associate professor at University of Berlin and was visiting professor at the University of Santiago de Compostela, Spain, in 1923 and 1924. In 1924 he became Director of the Institute of Physiology at University of Freiburg-im-Breisgau. The university was completely destroyed in an aerial raid in 1944, but Hoffmann later continued his work in a new building, until he retired in 1955. He received honorary doctorates from the Humboldt University of Berlin and the University of Zurich.

Due to his major contributions to the field he was nominated in the 1950's several times for the nobel prize in physiology and medicine.

== The Hoffmann(-Tinel) sign ==
Hoffmann described the sign in March 1915, several months before the French neurologist Jules Tinel published his own account in October 1915. The sign termed as Hoffmann's sign (H-sign) was elicited by tapping distal to the site of injured nerve which produced tingling sensation, the sensation was neither permanent nor severe, and heralds nerve regeneration. In October 1915, Jules Tinel described the same phenomenon in French "le signe de fourmillement". The two were on opposing sides of the war and were unaware of each other's papers, plausibly because of the wartime breakdown in scientific communication.

Hoffmann cautioned that the paresthesias indicated regeneration of sensory fibers and not necessarily motor recovery — a nuance that, because he was less widely recognized than Tinel, was overlooked by many of his contemporaries. In the Anglo-American literature the eponym collapsed to "Tinel's sign," largely following Emanuel Kaplan's 1972 English translation of Tinel's article, whereas German-speaking countries retained the historically more accurate "Hoffmann-Tinel-Zeichen."

== The H-Reflex ==
Hoffmann's enduring legacy is the reflex that bears his initial. Building on his electrophysiological training, he described the direct and the reflex response in the triceps surae muscle in humans following electrical stimulation of the tibial nerve in the popliteal fossa. This gave neurophysiology an electrically elicited analogue of the mechanical tendon reflex — a way to probe the monosynaptic reflex arc in intact, conscious humans. The exact date of the discovery is unknown, some accounts place the first description in 1910, drawing on his early studies of human reflexes, while others locate the definitive electrical elicitation of the late reflex wave in his 1918 paper "Über die Beziehungen der Sehnenreflexe zur willkürlichen Bewegung und zum Tonus" in the Zeitschrift für Biologie; still other biographical sources give 1922 for the first description of the H-reflex proper. The safest reading is that the work unfolded across the 1910s and was consolidated in his 1922 monograph. The eponym itself came much later and from abroad: in 1950 the renowned neurologist J. W. Magladery of Johns Hopkins/Baltimore named it the "H-reflex" in Hoffmann's honor.
