= H-reflex =

Muscle response

The H-reflex (or Hoffmann's reflex) is a reflectory reaction of muscles after electrical stimulation of sensory fibers (Ia afferents stemming from muscle spindles) in their innervating nerves (for example, those located behind the knee). The H-reflex test is performed using an electric stimulator, which gives usually a square-wave current of short duration and small amplitude (higher stimulations might involve alpha fibers, causing an F-wave, compromising the results), and an EMG set, to record the muscle response. That response is usually a clear wave, called H-wave, 28-35 ms after the stimulus, not to be confused with an F-wave. An M-wave, an early response, occurs 3-6 ms after the onset of stimulation. The H and F-waves are later responses. As the stimulus increases, the amplitude of the F-wave increases only slightly, and the H-wave decreases, and at supramaximal stimulus, the H-wave will disappear. The M-wave does the opposite of the H-wave. As the stimulus increases the M-wave increases. There is a point of minimal stimulus where the M-wave is absent and the H-wave is maximal.

H-reflex is analogous to the mechanically induced spinal stretch reflex (for example, knee jerk reflex). "The primary difference between the H-reflex and the spinal stretch reflex is that the H-reflex bypasses the muscle spindle, and, therefore, is a valuable tool in assessing modulation of monosynaptic reflex activity in the spinal cord." Although stretch reflex gives just qualitative information about muscle spindles and reflex arc activity, if the purpose of the test is to compare performances from different subjects, H-reflex should be used. In that case, in fact, latencies (ms) and amplitudes (mV) of H-wave can be compared.

H-reflex amplitudes measured by EMG are shown to decrease significantly with applied pressure such as massage and tapping to the cited muscle. The amount of decrease seems to be dependent on the force of the pressure, with higher pressures resulting in lower H-reflex amplitudes. H-reflex levels return to baseline immediately after pressure is released except in high pressure cases which had baseline levels returned within the first 10 seconds.

After about 5 days in zero gravity, for instance in orbit around Earth, the h-reflex diminishes significantly. It is generally assumed that this is due to a marked reduction in the excitability of the spinal cord in zero gravity. Once back on Earth, a marked recovery occurs during the first day, but it can take up to 10 days to return to normal. The H-reflex was the first medical experiment completed on the International Space Station.

== History ==
It was first described by Paul Hoffmann (hence the name) in 1910.

== See also ==
- F wave
