= F wave =

Motor response evoked by electrical stimulation of a nerve

In neuroscience, an F wave is one of several motor responses which may follow the direct motor response (M) evoked by electrical stimulation of peripheral motor or mixed (sensory and motor) nerves. F-waves are the second of two late voltage changes observed after stimulation is applied to the skin surface above the distal region of a nerve, in addition to the H-reflex (Hoffman's Reflex) which is a muscle reaction in response to electrical stimulation of innervating sensory fibers. Traversal of F-waves along the entire length of peripheral nerves between the spinal cord and muscle, allows for assessment of motor nerve conduction between distal stimulation sites in the arm and leg, and related motoneurons (MN's) in the cervical and lumbosacral cord. F-waves are able to assess both afferent and efferent loops of the alpha motor neuron in its entirety. As such, various properties of F-wave motor nerve conduction are analyzed in nerve conduction studies (NCS), and often used to assess polyneuropathies, resulting from states of neuronal demyelination and loss of peripheral axonal integrity.

With respect to its nomenclature, the F-wave is so named as it was initially studied in the smaller muscles of the foot. The observation of F-waves in the same motor units (MU) as those present in the direct motor response (M), along with the presence of F-waves in deafferented animal and human models, indicates that F-waves require direct activation of motor axons to be elicited, and do not involve conduction along afferent sensory nerves. Thus, the F-wave is considered a wave, as opposed to a reflex.

== Physiology ==
F-waves are evoked by strong electrical stimuli (supramaximal) applied to the skin surface above the distal portion of a nerve. This impulse travels both in orthodromic fashion (towards the muscle fibers) and antidromic fashion (towards the cell body in the spinal cord) along the alpha motor neuron. As the orthodromic impulse reaches innervated muscle fibers, a strong direct motor response (M) is evoked in these muscle fibers, resulting in a primary compound muscle action potential (CMAP). As the antidromic impulse reaches the cell bodies within the anterior horn of the motor neuron pool by retrograde transmission, a select portion of these alpha motor neurons, (roughly 5-10% of available motor neurons), 'backfire' or rebound. This antidromic 'backfiring' elicits an orthodromic impulse that follows back down the alpha motor neuron, towards innervated muscle fibers. Conventionally, axonal segments of motor neurons previously depolarized by preceding antidromic impulses enter a hyperpolarized state, disallowing the travel of impulses along them. However, these same axonal segments remains excitable or relatively depolarized for a sufficient period of time, allowing for rapid antidromic backfiring, and thus the continuation of the orthodromic impulse towards innervated muscle fibers. This successive orthodromic stimulus then evokes a smaller population of muscle fibers, resulting in a smaller CMAP known as an F-wave.

Several physiological factors may possibly influence the presence of F-waves after peripheral nerve stimulation. The shape and size of F-waves, along with the probability of their presence is small, as a high degree of variability exists in motor unit (MU) activation for any given stimulation. Thus, the generation of CMAP's which elicit F-waves is subject to the variability in activation of motor units in a given pool over successive stimuli. Moreover, stimulation of peripheral nerve fibers account for both orthodromic impulses (along sensory fibers, towards the dorsal horn), as well as antidromic activity (along alpha motor neurons towards the ventral horn). Antidromic activity along collateral branches of alpha motor neurons may result in the activation of inhibitory Renshaw cells or direct inhibitory collaterals between motorneurons. Inhibition by these means may lower excitability of adjacent motor neurons and decrease the potential for antidromic backfiring and resultant F-waves; although it has been argued Renshaw cells preferentially inhibit smaller alpha motor neurons limited influence on modulation of antidromic backfiring.

Because a different population of anterior horn cells is stimulated with each stimulation, F waves are characterized as ubiquitous, low amplitude, late motor responses, which can vary in amplitude, latency and configuration across a series of stimuli.

== Properties ==
F waves can be analyzed by several properties including:

- amplitude (μV) - height or voltage of F wave
- duration (ms) - length of F wave
- latency (ms) - period between initial stimulation and F wave elicitation

== Measurements ==
Several measurements can be done on the F responses, including:

- minimal and maximal F wave latencies (ms) - frequently used in the assessment of demyelinating neuropathic conditions including Guillain-Barré syndrome.
- chronodispersion - difference in maximal and minimal latencies across a series of F waves
- F wave persistence - measure of alpha motor neuron excitability calculated as the number of F responses elicited divided by the number of stimuli presented.

The minimal F wave latency is typically 25-32 ms in the upper extremities and 45-56 ms in the lower extremities.

F wave persistence is the number of F waves obtained per the number of stimulations, which is normally 80-100% (or above 50%).

== See also ==
- H reflex
- Electromyography (EMG)
