= Hugo Rühle =

German physician (1824–1888)

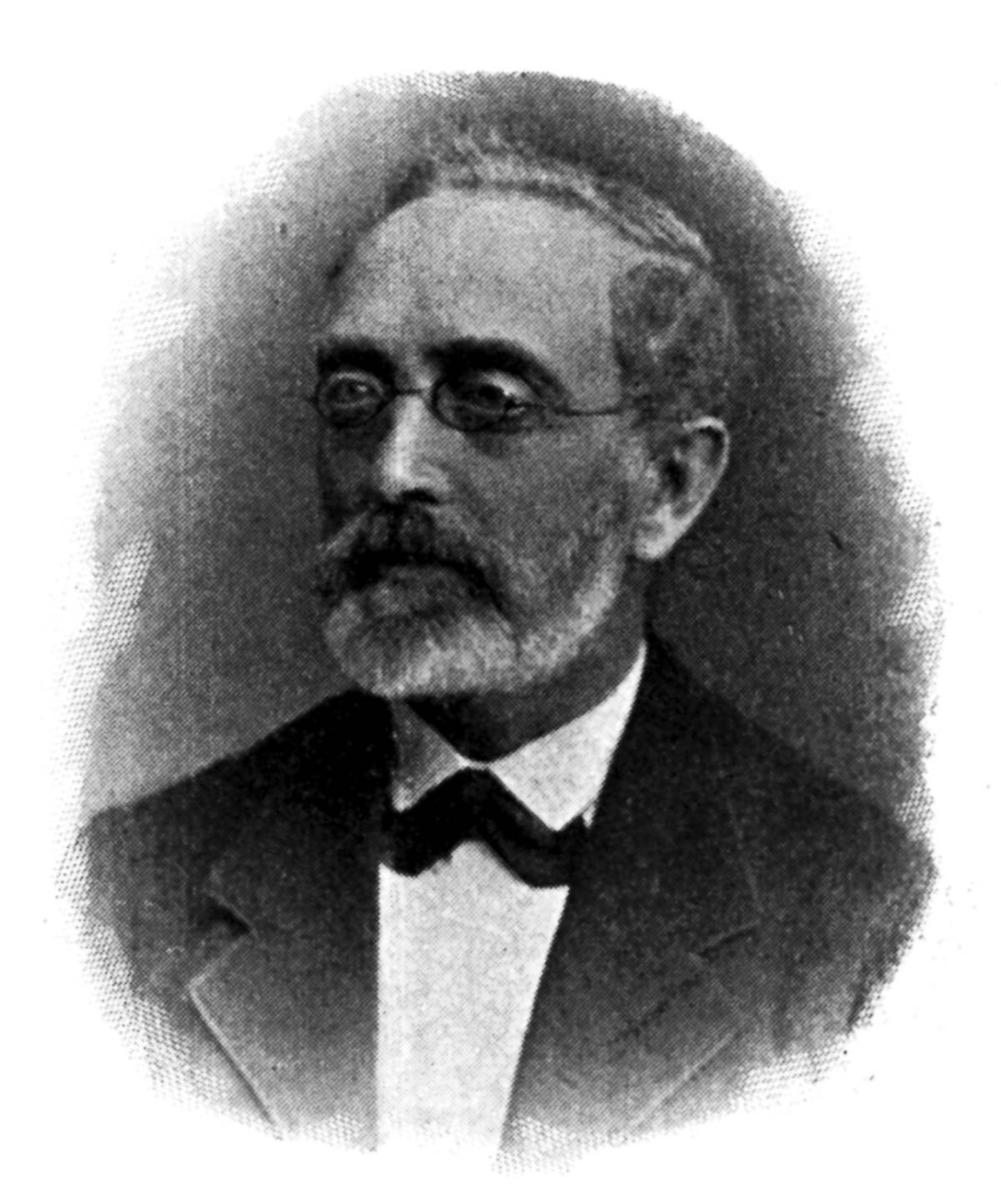
- Born: 12 September 1824; Liegnitz, Kingdom of Prussia
- Died: 11 July 1888 (aged 63); Bonn, Kingdom of Prussia, German Empire
- Occupation: Physician
- Medical career
- Institutions: University of Breslau; University of Bonn; University of Greifswald

Hugo Ernst Heinrich Rühle (12 September 1824 – 11 July 1888) was a German medical doctor. He was born in Liegnitz (today Legnica, Poland).

From 1842 to 1848 he studied medicine in Berlin, where he came under the influence of Rudolf Virchow (1821–1902) Benno Reinhardt (1819–1852) and Ludwig Traube (1818–1876). After graduation, he worked at the Allerheiligenhospital in Breslau, and in 1852 remained in Breslau as an assistant at the medical clinic of Friedrich Theodor von Frerichs (1819–1885). In 1859 he became director of the polyclinic and a professor at the University of Breslau.

From 1860 to 1864 he was director of the clinical medicine department at the University of Greifswald, afterwards holding down the same position at the University of Bonn. Two of his better known assistants were physician Hugo von Ziemssen (1829–1902) at Greifswald and physiologist Nathan Zuntz (1847–1920) at Bonn.

== Selected publications ==
- Die Kehlkopf-Krankheiten (Laryngeal diseases), 1861.
- Über den gegenwärtigen Stand der Tuberkulosenfrage (On the present state of tuberculosis), 1871.
- Die Lungenschwindsucht und die acute Miliartuberkulose (Pulmonary tuberculosis and acute miliary tuberculosis), 1877.
