= Tinel's sign =

Medical test to detect nerve inflammation

- Transverse section across the wrist and digits. (The median nerve is the yellow dot near the center. The carpal tunnel is not labeled, but the circular structure surrounding the median nerve is visible.)
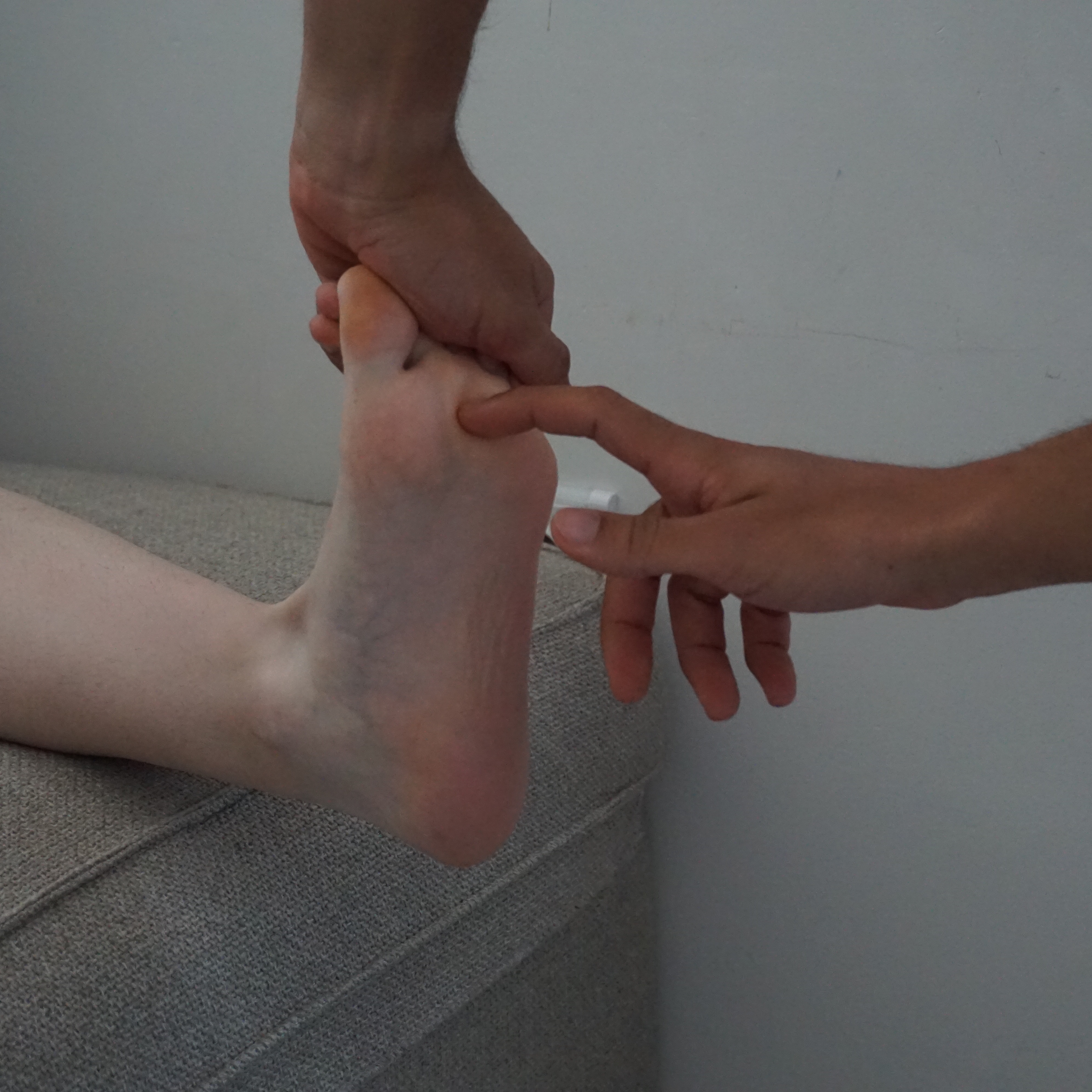
- A photograph conveying Tinel's sign being performed on the left foot to support the diagnosis of morton's neuroma.
- Specialty: Neurology, Physical medicine and rehabilitation, Plastic surgery
- Differential diagnosis: Peripheral neuropathy, Radiculopathy, Plexopathy

Tinel's sign (also Hoffmann-Tinel sign or Tinel's test) is a way to detect irritated nerves. It is performed by lightly tapping (percussing) over the nerve to elicit a sensation of tingling or "pins and needles" in the distribution of the nerve. Percussion is usually performed moving distal to proximal. It is named after Jules Tinel.

This sign is commonly used in the evaluation of compression neuropathies, including carpal tunnel syndrome, cubital tunnel syndrome, anterior tarsal tunnel syndrome and symptomatic neuroma. It may also be used to monitor recovery following peripheral nerve injury or nerve repair.

Studies show that the diagnostic performance of Tinel's sign varies substantially between populations and clinical settings, and it is generally interpreted alongside other physical examination findings and electrodiagnostic testing.

== History ==
Tinel's sign takes its name from French neurologist Jules Tinel (1879–1952), who wrote about it in a journal article published in October 1915. Tinel described the sign while studying peripheral nerve injuries in soldiers during World War I. He found that percussion over an injured nerve could produce tingling in the distal distribution of regenerating nerve fibers.

German neurologist Paul Hoffmann independently also published an article on tinel sign six months earlier, in March 1915. Previously, in 1909, Trotter and Davies published their findings that sensations elicited distal to the point of nerve resection are referred to the area or point of nerve resection; however they "failed to comment on the clinical relevance of their observation."

== Technique ==
Tinel's sign is performed by lightly tapping or percussing over the suspected site of nerve compression or injury. The maneuver is typically repeated along the course of the nerve. A test is considered positive when tapping produces paresthesia radiating distally along the sensory distribution of the nerve being examined.

For example, when performed at the wrist in suspected carpal tunnel syndrome, percussion over the median nerve at the carpal tunnel may reproduce tingling in the thumb, index finger, middle finger, or radial half of the ring finger. This is in line with the sensation distribution of that nerve.

The test may also be performed along the length of an injured peripheral nerve to evaluate nerve regeneration following trauma or surgical repair.

== Clinical use ==
Tinel sign is commonly used in evaluating entrapment neuropathies. Most commonly, carpal tunnel syndrome.

The most studied analysis of Tinel's sign is for carpal tunnel syndrome. One systematic review including 67 studies reported a median sensitivity of approximately 0.59 and specificity of approximately 0.80 for diagnosing carpal tunnel syndrome. The sensitivity and specificity data indicates that the test correctly identifies most patients without the condition but also misses a good portion of individuals who do have it.

Another review found pooled sensitivity around 0.45 and pooled specificity around 0.78. Unfortunately, there is variability between studies. Clinical guidelines emphasize that no single provocative test can reliably diagnose carpal tunnel syndrome, and Tinel's sign is typically interpreted with other tests such as Phalen's maneuver and nerve conduction studies. As for all clinical diagnoses, it is vital to take into account the patient's symptom history.

Tinel's sign may also be elicited in other compression neuropathies, including cubital tunnel syndrome, tarsal tunnel syndrome, and Guyon canal syndrome. For these diagnoses, percussion over the affected nerve reproduces paresthesia in its sensory distribution, which varies depending on the suspected clinical diagnosis. It may be useful in identifying occipital neuralgia, superficial peroneal neuropathy, and symptomatic neuromas.

== Peripheral nerve injury and regeneration ==
Tinel's sign is typically used in the context of peripheral nerve injury due to compression under anatomical structures. However, tapping over a nerve during recovery from an injury may produce a tingling in the distribution of the recovering nerve.

This concept that many clinicians might find valuable is the advancing Tinel's sign phenomenon. This is when the point of paresthesia progresses distally along the course of the nerve as regenerating axons advance during recovery. An example of this would be during a median nerve injury at the wrist, where paresthesia may initially begin at the palm, but later advance down to the 1st-3rd digits during nerve recovery. This is because the distal nerve fibers undergo Wallerian degeneration after injury and new axons grow distally from the proximal stump, causing the most distal point along the nerve where percussion elicits paresthesia to move progressively toward the fingers.

This phenomenon has been used as an indicator of nerve regeneration following trauma or nerve surgery.

== Limitations ==
The usefulness of Tinel's sign in a clinical setting is limited by the variability in diagnostic accuracy as well as differences in examiner technique. Previous studies that have evaluated carpal tunnel syndrome reported wide ranges in sensitivity and specificity. Because of this variability, the general consensus is that physical examination maneuvers alone are often insufficient to establish the diagnosis of compression neuropathies. Additional information from the patient history and tests such as electrodiagnostic studies should be used to confirm the diagnosis of peripheral nerve compression, and is required before getting carpal tunnel release surgery.

== See also ==
- Hoffmann's sign
- Phalen maneuver
