= Friedrich Theodor von Frerichs =

German pathologist (1819–1885)

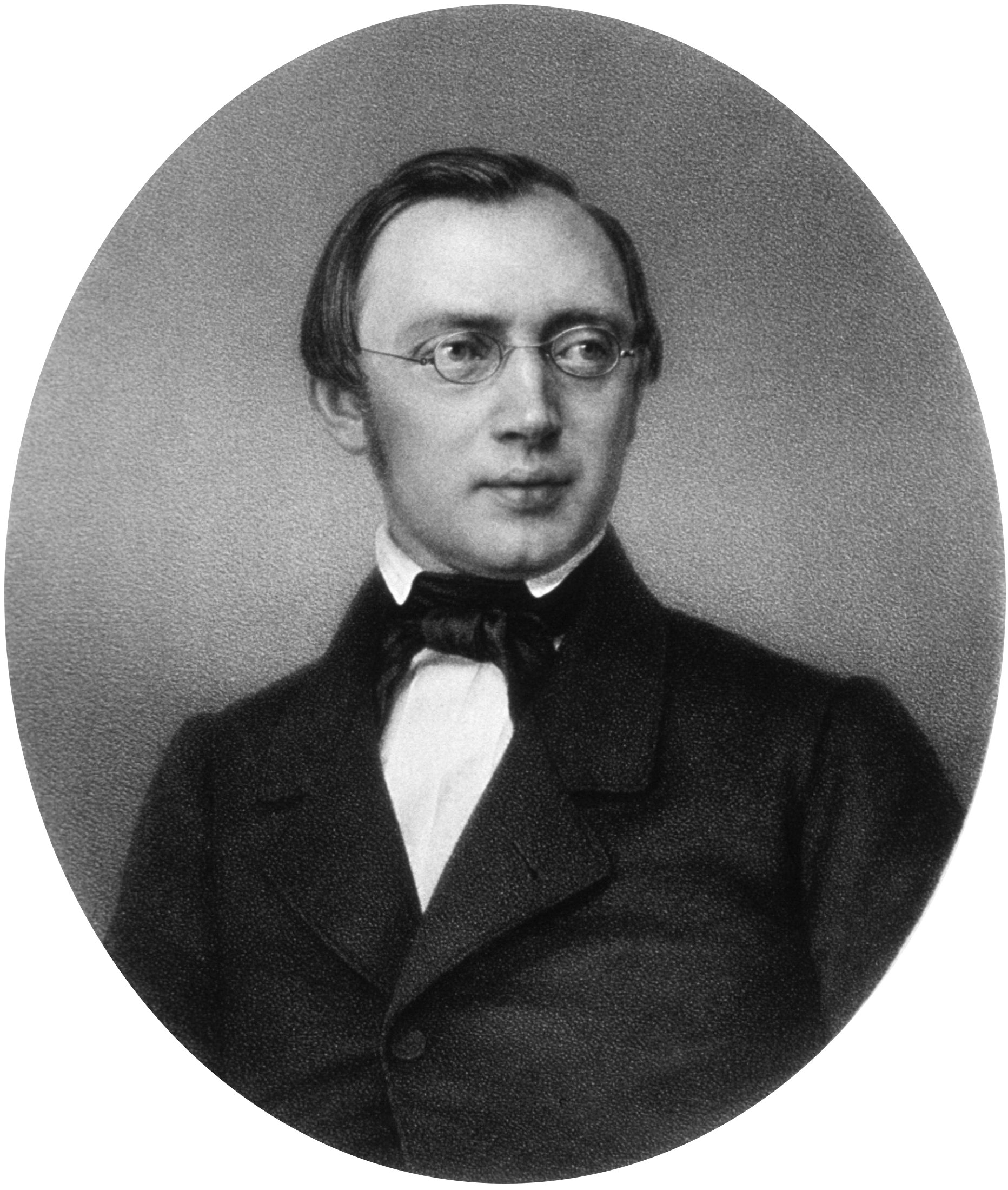
- Friedrich Theodor von Frerichs
- Born: 24 March 1819; Aurich, Kingdom of Hanover (now Germany)
- Died: 14 March 1885 (aged 65); Berlin, Germany
- Education: University of Göttingen
- Scientific career
- Fields: pathologist

Friedrich Theodor von Frerichs (24 March 1819 – 14 March 1885) was a German pathologist born in Aurich.

After earning his medical degree from the University of Göttingen in 1841, he returned to Aurich, where he spent several years working as an optician. In 1846 he returned to the University of Göttingen as an instructor, afterwards serving as a professor at the Universities of Kiel (1850) and Breslau (1852). In 1859 he succeeded Johann Lukas Schönlein as head physician at the Charité in Berlin. He remained at the Charité until his death in 1885. Some of his better known assistants and students included Paul Ehrlich (1854–1915), Adolf Weil (1848–1916), Paul Langerhans (1847–1888), Bernhard Naunyn (1839–1925), Heinrich Irenaeus Quincke (1842–1922), Friedrich Albin Hoffmann (1843–1924), Wilhelm Ebstein (1836–1912) and Hugo Rühle (1824–1888).

Frerichs made many contributions to medical science, and is especially known for his research of kidney and liver diseases. He published the first German textbook of nephrology, and performed microscopic research of Bright's disease. He was the first to identify the three primary stages of Bright's disease and how the condition leads to fibrosis and atrophy. Frerichs gave the first clinical description of progressive familial hepatolenticular degeneration (now known as Wilson's disease), and also discovered the presence of leucine and tyrosine in urine involving yellow atrophy of the liver. He also described the anatomical changes that place in liver cirrhosis and malaria perniciosa.

Frerichs performed pioneer research of multiple sclerosis, and described nystagmus as a symptom of the disease. He also provided an early clinical description of a link between multiple sclerosis and certain mental disorders.

== Associated eponym ==
- "Frerichs's theory": Theory of uremic intoxication.

== Written works ==
- De polyporum structura penitiori. Göttingen, 1843.
- Untersuchungen über Galle in physiologischer und pathologischer Beziehung. Göttingen, 1845. -- Studies of bile in physiological and pathological relationships.
- Commentatio de natura miasmatis palustris. (habilitation thesis), Göttingen, 1845.
- Über Gallert- und Colloidgeschwülste. 1847 – On gelatinous and colloid tumors.
- Über das Mass des Stoffwechsels, sowie über die Verwendung der Stickstoffhaltigen und stickstoffreien Nahrungsstoffe. Archiv für Anatomie, Physiologie und wissenschaftliche Medicin, Leipzig, 1849. -- On the measure of metabolism, and on the use of nitrogen-containing and nitrogen-free nutrients.
- Ueber Hirnsklerose. Archiv für die gesammte Medicin, Jena, 1849, 10: 334–350 --- treatise on sclerosis
- Die Bright’sche Nierenkrankheit und deren Behandlung. Braunschweig, Friedrich Vieweg und Sohn, 1851 --- Bright's kidney disease and its treatment.
- Klinik der Leberkrankheiten. 2 volumes and atlas. Braunschweig, Friedrich Vieweg und Sohn; translated into English and published as: "A clinical treatise on diseases of the liver" (vol. 1, 1860); (vol. 2).
- Über den Diabetes. Berlin, 1884. --- treatise on diabetes.
