= Cuboid syndrome =

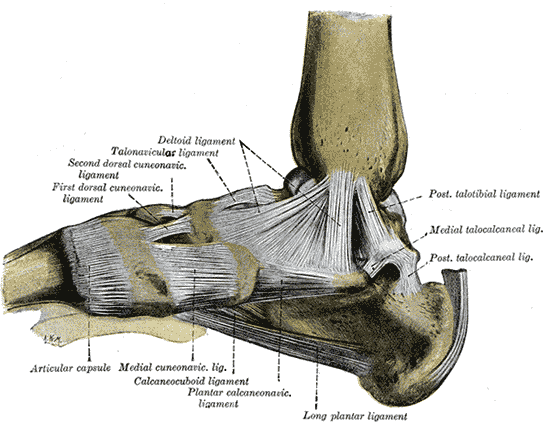
- Calcaneocuboid (bottom center)
- Specialty: Orthopedic surgery

Cuboid syndrome or cuboid subluxation is a condition that results from subtle injury to the calcaneocuboid joint and ligaments in the vicinity of the cuboid bone, one of seven tarsal bones of the human foot.

This condition often manifests in the form of lateral (little toe side) foot pain and sometimes general foot weakness. Cuboid syndrome, which is relatively common but not well defined or recognized, is known by many other names, including lateral plantar neuritis, cuboid fault syndrome, peroneal cuboid syndrome, dropped cuboid, locked cuboid and subluxed cuboid.

== Signs and symptoms ==
A patient with cuboid syndrome usually seeks medical advice and attention complaining of pain, discomfort, or weakness along the lateral aspect of the foot between the fourth and fifth metatarsals and the calcaneocuboid joint. The pain may radiate throughout the foot. Tenderness may be elicited over the tendon of the peroneus longus muscle and an antalgic gait may be observed. The pain may be observed in a controlled environment by standing on the toes or rolling the arches of the foot, as these motions tend to exercise the foot's calcaneocuboid joint and ligament, which are characteristically strained in a patient suffering from cuboid syndrome. Also, the pain may come on suddenly or it may develop gradually and persist over time. Sometimes the pain is intermittent, subsiding partially or completely for a period of time before returning again.

== Causes ==
Cuboid syndrome may develop through either a single traumatic event such as an ankle sprain or insidiously with repetitive strain over time. The exact etiology of cuboid syndrome remains unclear but many ideas have been proposed. Such ideas include excessive pronation of the foot, overuse injury, and inversion ankle sprains. The favored idea is that the cuboid bone is forcefully everted while the calcaneus is inverted resulting in incongruity at the calcaneocuboid joint. The condition mainly affects athletes, especially those whose activities incur a significant amount of pressure on their feet from jumping or running (such as ballet dancers and runners) and those who place added strain on their feet during lateral maneuvering (such as tennis and basketball players).

=== Risk factors ===
Suspected risk factors for cuboid syndrome include obesity, midtarsal instability, poorly fitting footwear, physical exercise, inadequate recovery from physical activity, physical training on uneven surfaces, and ankle sprains.

== Treatment ==
Once diagnosed, a medical professional may treat cuboid syndrome by realigning (also known as reducing) the subluxed cuboid unless contraindications to manipulation are present such as inflammatory arthritis including gout, bony disease, neurovascular compromise, or a bone fracture. This form of manual manipulation of the foot should be done by a trained specialist, such as an orthopedic surgeon or podiatrist, athletic trainer, osteopathic physician, or physical therapist. Further treatment may take into account other considerations, such as possible causes or aggravators (e.g. recommending that the patient be fit with custom orthotics if they are overprone). Fortunately, subluxed cuboids are generally quite treatable and most patients return to a normal level of activity once the pain is brought under control.

== See also ==
- Arthritis
- Physiatry
- Rheumatology
- Tarsal tunnel syndrome
