= Tarsal tunnel =

Canal in the ankle area

- Medial view of the ankle. The structures within the tarsal tunnel are depicted.
- Dissection video (1 min 55 s)

Details

Identifiers
- Latin: canalis tarsi

The tarsal tunnel is a passage found along the inner leg underneath the medial malleolus of the ankle.

== Structure ==
The roof of the tarsal tunnel is formed by the flexor retinaculum of the foot. The floor of the tarsal tunnel is formed by the medial malleolus and the calcaneus.

=== Contents ===
The tibial nerve, posterior tibial artery, posterior tibial vein, and flexor tendons travel in a bundle along this pathway through the tarsal tunnel, in the following order from anteromedial to posterolateral:

- Tibialis posterior tendon.
- Flexor digitorum longus tendon.
- Posterior tibial artery.
- Posterior tibial vein.
- Tibial nerve.
- Flexor hallucis longus tendon.

In the tunnel, the tibial nerve splits into three different paths. The medial calcaneal branches of the tibial nerve continues to the heel, while the medial plantar nerve and the lateral plantar nerve continue on to the bottom of the foot.

== Clinical significance ==
=== Tarsal tunnel syndrome ===
Tarsal tunnel syndrome is the most commonly reported nerve entrapment of the ankle. It is analogous to carpal tunnel syndrome in the wrist. It is caused by compression of the tibial nerve underneath the flexor retinaculum of the foot. People with tarsal tunnel syndrome have pain in the plantar aspect of the foot mostly at night. Weight bearing increases pain and weakness is found on intrinsic foot muscles with positive Tinel sign at the tunnel. There is no tenderness present on the plantar foot, though this is typically the primary site of complaint.

== Additional images ==
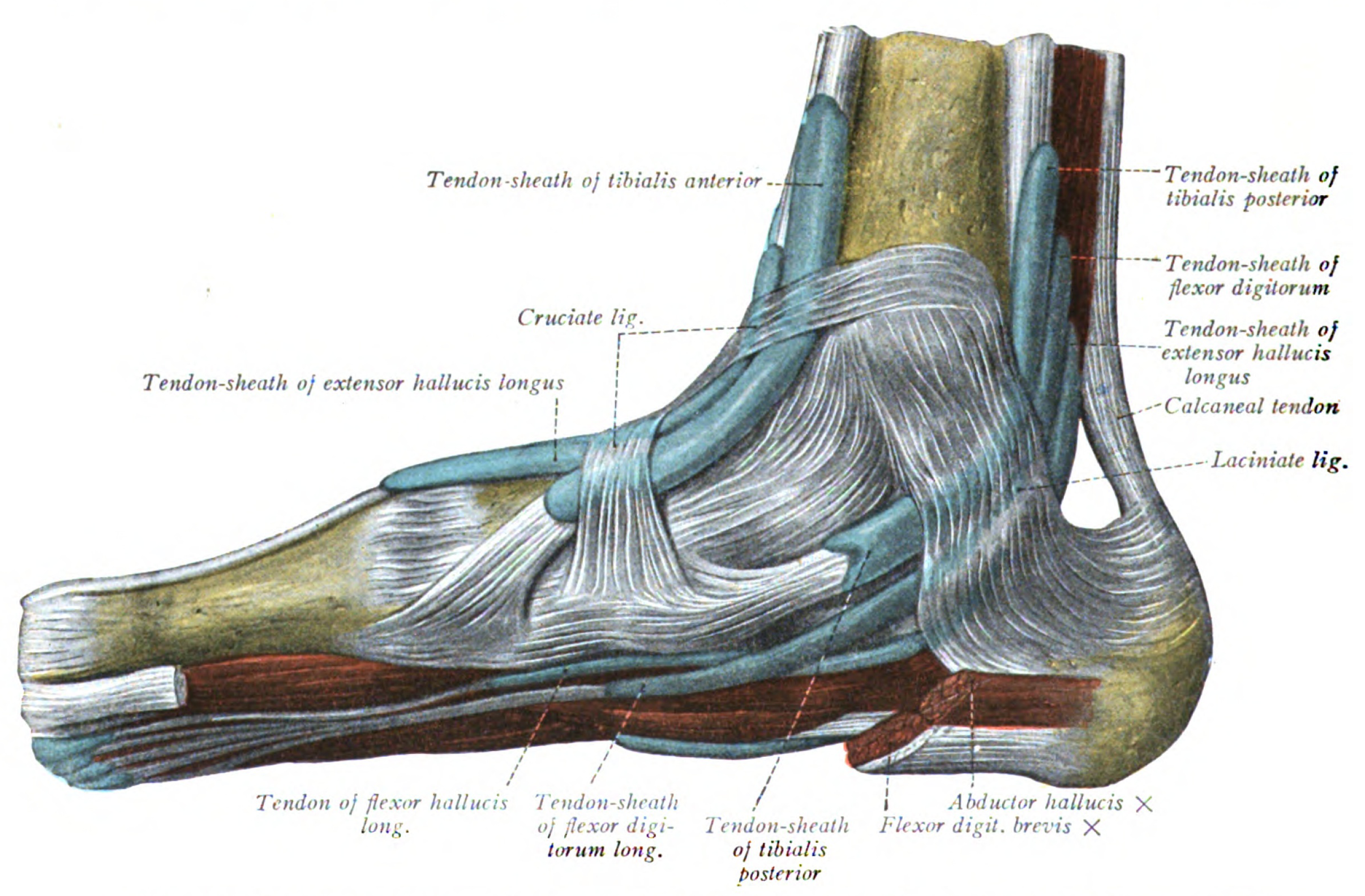
The mucous sheaths of the tendons around the ankle. Medial aspect. The flexor retinaculum is labelled as laciniate lig.

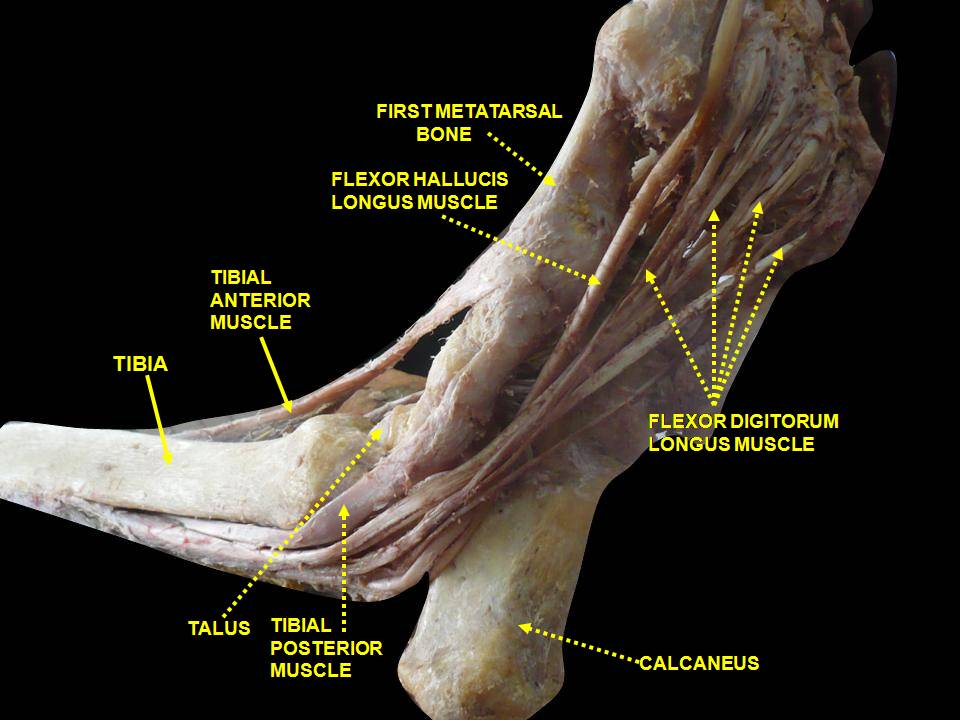
Dissection image. Around the medial malleolus seeing from below.

Dissection video (41 s)

== See also ==
- Tarsal tunnel syndrome
- Carpal tunnel
