= Jules Tinel =

French neurologist (1879–1952)

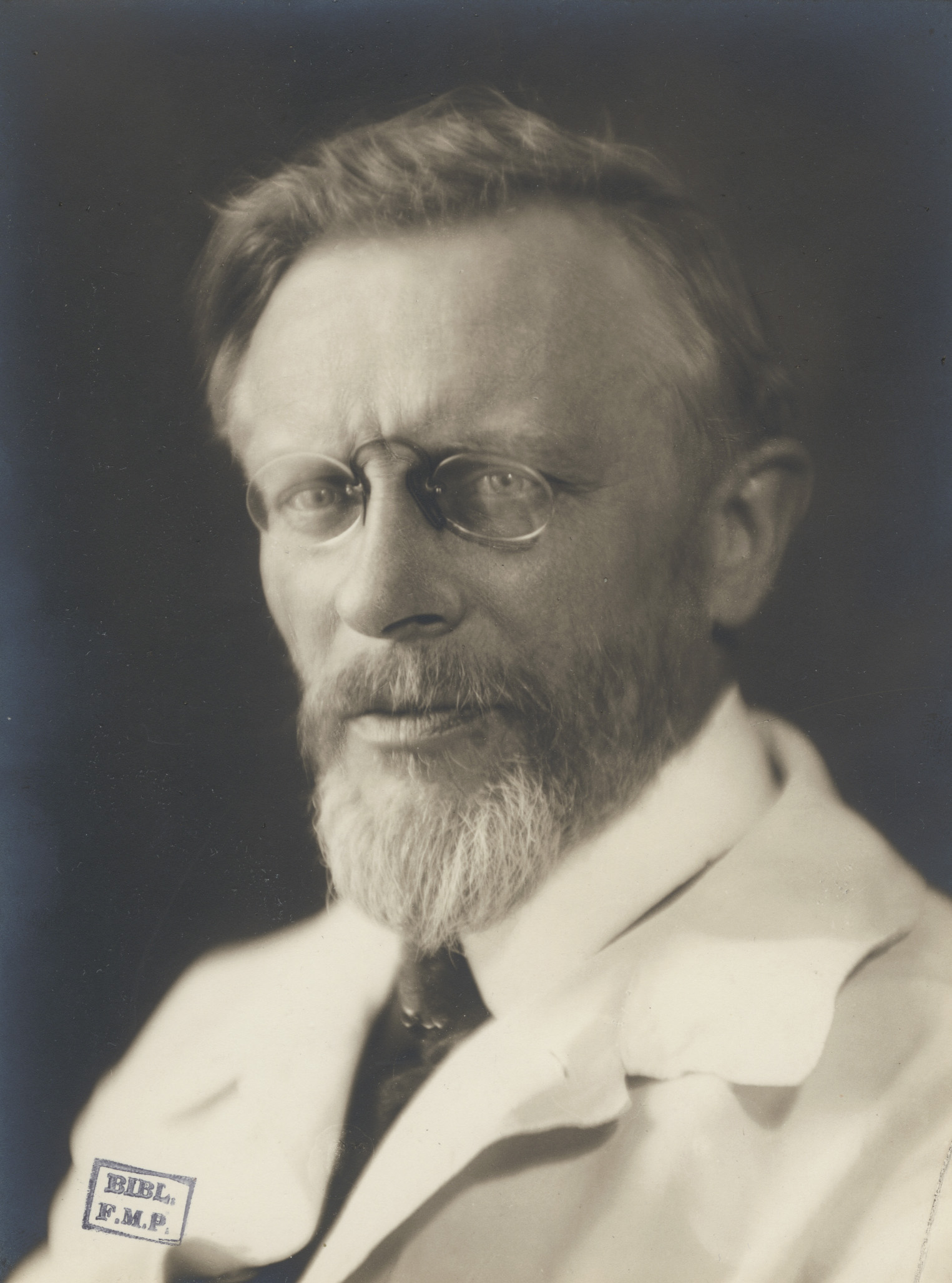
- Born: October 12, 1879; Rouen, Normandy, France
- Died: 1952
- Known for: Tinel's sign First description of a Phaeochromocytoma (1922)
- Scientific career
- Fields: Neurology
- Workplaces: Chief of the laboratory at the Pitié-Salpêtrière Hospital; Head of the Neurological Centre at Le Mans; Physician at La Rochefoucauld, Hôpital Beaujon and Hôpital Boucicaut
- Thesis: Les Radiculites et le Tabes (1910)
- Doctoral advisor: Joseph Jules Dejerine; Louis Théophile Joseph Landouzy; René Laennec
- Other academic advisors: Charles Emile Troisier; Arnold Netter

Jules Tinel (1879 in Rouen – 1952) was a French neurologist remembered for describing Tinel's sign.

== Biography ==
Jules Tinel was born in 1879 into a family with a five generation history of medical professionals. He studied in Rouen before moving to Paris. He became externe des hôpitaul in 1901 and interne in 1906. He studied under Charles Emile Troisier, Joseph Jules Dejerine, Louis Théophile Joseph Landouzy, and Arnold Netter, and was inspired to study neurology by Dejerine. He received his M.D. in 1910 with a thesis on nerve involvement of tabes which came from work done with Dejerine, Landouzy, and Laennec. He became chef de clinique in 1911 and chief of the laboratory at the Pitié-Salpêtrière Hospital in 1913.

In 1914 he was called up, and became head of the neurological centre at Le Mans. In Autumn 1915, he published his famous article about the distal regeneration sign, then baptised Tinel's sign. In 1916, he published in French an amazing book about the cutaneous nerves distribution of the whole body. Each aesthesiography is a mapping of the hypoaesthetic area induced by the nerve injury. In 1917, this book has been translated in English After he was demobilised in 1919 he worked on psychosomatic medicine. He was associated with the first description of a phaeochromocytoma in 1922. He worked as a physician at La Rochefoucauld from 1922 to 1936, then at Beaujon Hospital (Clichy) until 1940, and in Paris at the Hôpital Boucicaut until his retirement in 1945. He became unwell in 1939 with heart disease, but returned to work after a few months.

During the Second World War Tinel was active in the French Resistance. He hid allied airmen whom his son Jacques would then smuggle from France to Spain. When Jacques was arrested Tinel searched for him in Bayonne and was himself arrested and imprisoned in Bordeaux. His wife and second son were also arrested and imprisoned in Fresnes. Tinel was released after several months, but Jacques was sent to Mittelbau-Dora where he died.

After his retirement in 1945 Tinel continued to work in Boucicaut. In 1947 he had an episode of aphasia which recovered after some weeks, and he returned to work. He died in 1952 of heart failure.

Brincourt concluded his fine eulogy this way: ‘‘His indefatigable devotion, his goodness and his selflessness were only known to his patients. His modesty and dislike of public gatherings prevented his work from having the dissemination it deserved. The medical corps was unaware of his merit’’
