= Mucous sheaths of the tendons around the ankle =

Ankle tendon projectors

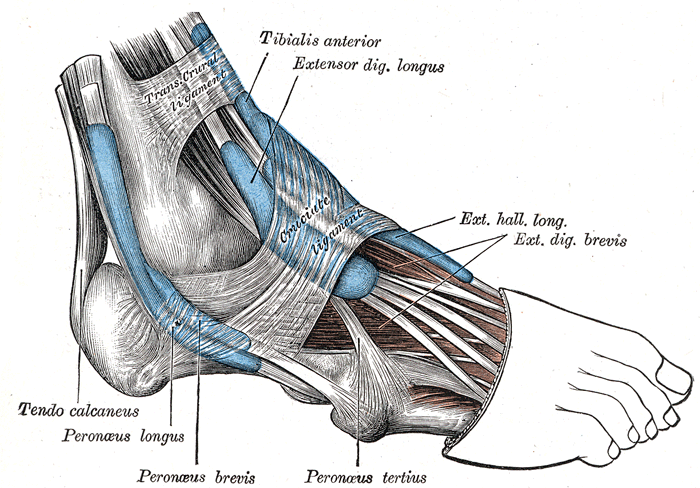
- The mucous sheaths of the tendons around the ankle. Lateral aspect.

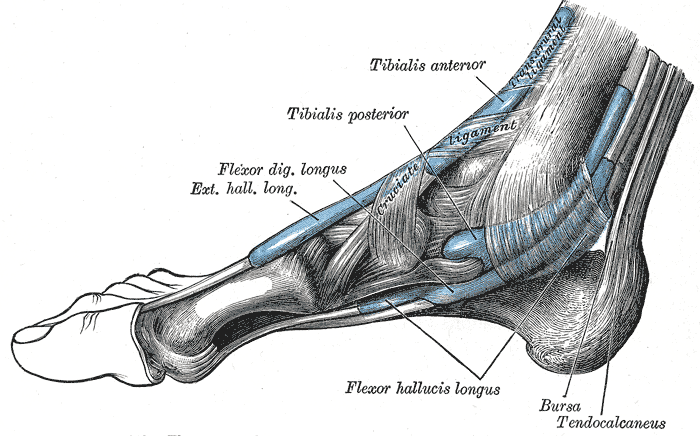
- The mucous sheaths of the tendons around the ankle. Medial aspect.

Identifiers
- TA98: A04.8.06.001
- TA2: 2754
- FMA: 71601

The mucous sheaths of the tendons around the ankle protect tendons in the ankle. All the tendons crossing the ankle-joint are enclosed for part of their length in mucous sheaths which have an almost uniform length of about 8 cm. each.

== Front of the ankle ==
On the front of the ankle the sheath for the Tibialis anterior extends from the upper margin of the transverse crural ligament to the interval between the diverging limbs of the cruciate ligament; those for the Extensor digitorum longus and Extensor hallucis longus reach upward to just above the level of the tips of the malleoli, the former being the higher.

The sheath of the Extensor hallucis longus is prolonged on to the base of the first metatarsal bone, while that of the Extensor digitorum longus reaches only to the level of the base of the fifth metatarsal.

== Medial side of the ankle ==
On the medial (closer to the center line of the body) side of the ankle the sheath for the Tibialis posterior extends highest up—to about 4 cm. above the tip of the malleolus—while below it stops just short of the tuberosity of the navicular.

The sheath for Flexor hallucis longus reaches up to the level of the tip of the malleolus, while that for the Flexor digitorum longus is slightly higher; the former is continued to the base of the first metatarsal, but the latter stops opposite the first cuneiform bone.

== Lateral side of the ankle ==
On the lateral (outer) side of the ankle a sheath which is single for the greater part of its extent encloses the Peronæi longus and brevis.

It extends upward for about 4 cm. above the tip of the malleolus and downward and forward for about the same distance.
