= Hoffmann's reflex =

Neurological examination via a reflex test

Hoffmann's reflex (Hoffmann's sign, sometimes simply Hoffmann's, or finger flexor reflex) is a neurological examination finding elicited by a reflex test which can help verify the presence or absence of issues arising from the corticospinal tract. It is named after neurologist Johann Hoffmann. Usually considered a pathological reflex in a clinical setting, the Hoffmann's reflex has also been used as a measure of spinal reflex processing (adaptation) in response to exercise training.

== Procedure ==
The Hoffmann's reflex test itself involves loosely holding the middle finger and flicking the fingernail downward, allowing the middle finger to flick upward reflexively. A positive response is seen when there is flexion and adduction of the thumb on the same hand. E.g. in hypertonia, the tips of other fingers flex and the thumb flexes and adducts.

=== Interpretations ===
A positive Hoffmann's reflex and finger jerks suggest hypertonia, but can occur in healthy individuals, and are not useful signs in isolation. In cerebellar diseases, the reflexes may be pendular, and muscle contraction and relaxation tend to be slow, but these are not sensitive or specific to cerebellar signs.

== Comparisons to Babinski sign ==
Hoffmann's sign is often considered the upper limb equivalent of the Babinski sign test. Hoffmann's reflex is often erroneously confused with Babinski's. However the two reflexes are quite different, and should not be equated with each other.

A positive Babinski sign is considered a pathological sign of upper motor neuron disease except for infants, in whom it is normal, whereas a positive Hoffmann's sign can be present in an entirely normal patient. A positive Hoffmann's sign in the normal patients is more commonly found in those who are naturally hyper-reflexive (e.g. 3+ reflexes). A positive Hoffmann's sign is a worrisome finding of a disease process if its presence is asymmetrical, or has an acute onset.

Another significant difference between Hoffmann's reflex and the Babinski sign is their mechanism of reflex. Hoffmann's reflex is a deep tendon reflex (spindle fibre) with a monosynaptic reflex pathway in Rexed lamina IX of the spinal cord, normally fully inhibited by descending input. On the other hand, the plantar reflex is more complicated and not a deep tendon reflex, and its pathway is both more complicated and not fully understood. Different sorts of lesions may interrupt them. This fact has led some neurologists to reject strongly any analogies between the finger flexor reflex and the plantar response. When both lower and upper neuron damage is indicated, it leads a physician to indicate a motor neuron illness, such as amyotrophic lateral sclerosis.

== See also ==
- Cervical spondylosis
