= List of bones of the human skeleton =

An adult human skeleton is commonly quoted as consisting of 206 bones. Reports on the typical number of bones have varied historically depending on how different sources choose to count features such as fused bones (for example, the sternum). The actual number of bones in any individual skeleton varies depending on factors such as age and anatomical variation.

The list of 206 bones in the adult skeleton can be subdivided into the axial skeleton (80 bones) and the appendicular skeleton (126 bones). 172 of 206 bones are part of a pair and the remaining 34 are unpaired. Many small accessory bones, such as sesamoid bones, are not included in the standard list.

== Introduction ==

Infants are born with an estimated 270 bones. During the course of normal human development, many bones fuse, a process that is active throughout childhood and puberty but typically continues until sometime within the third decade of life. Therefore, the number of bones in an individual may be evaluated differently throughout a lifetime. In addition, the bones of the skull and face are counted as separate bones, despite being fused naturally. Some reliable sesamoid bones such as the pisiform are counted, while others, such as the hallux sesamoids, are not.

Individuals may have more or fewer bones than the average (even accounting for developmental stage) owing to anatomical variations. The most common variations include sutural (wormian) bones, which are located along the sutural lines on the back of the skull, and sesamoid bones which develop within some tendons, mainly in the hands and feet. Some individuals may also have additional (i.e., supernumerary) cervical ribs or lumbar vertebrae. Amputations or other injuries may result in the loss of bones. Complete bone fractures may split one bone into multiple pieces. Other genetic conditions may result in abnormally higher (e.g. polydactyly or conjoined twins) or lower (e.g. oligodactyly) counts of bones.

== Bones ==
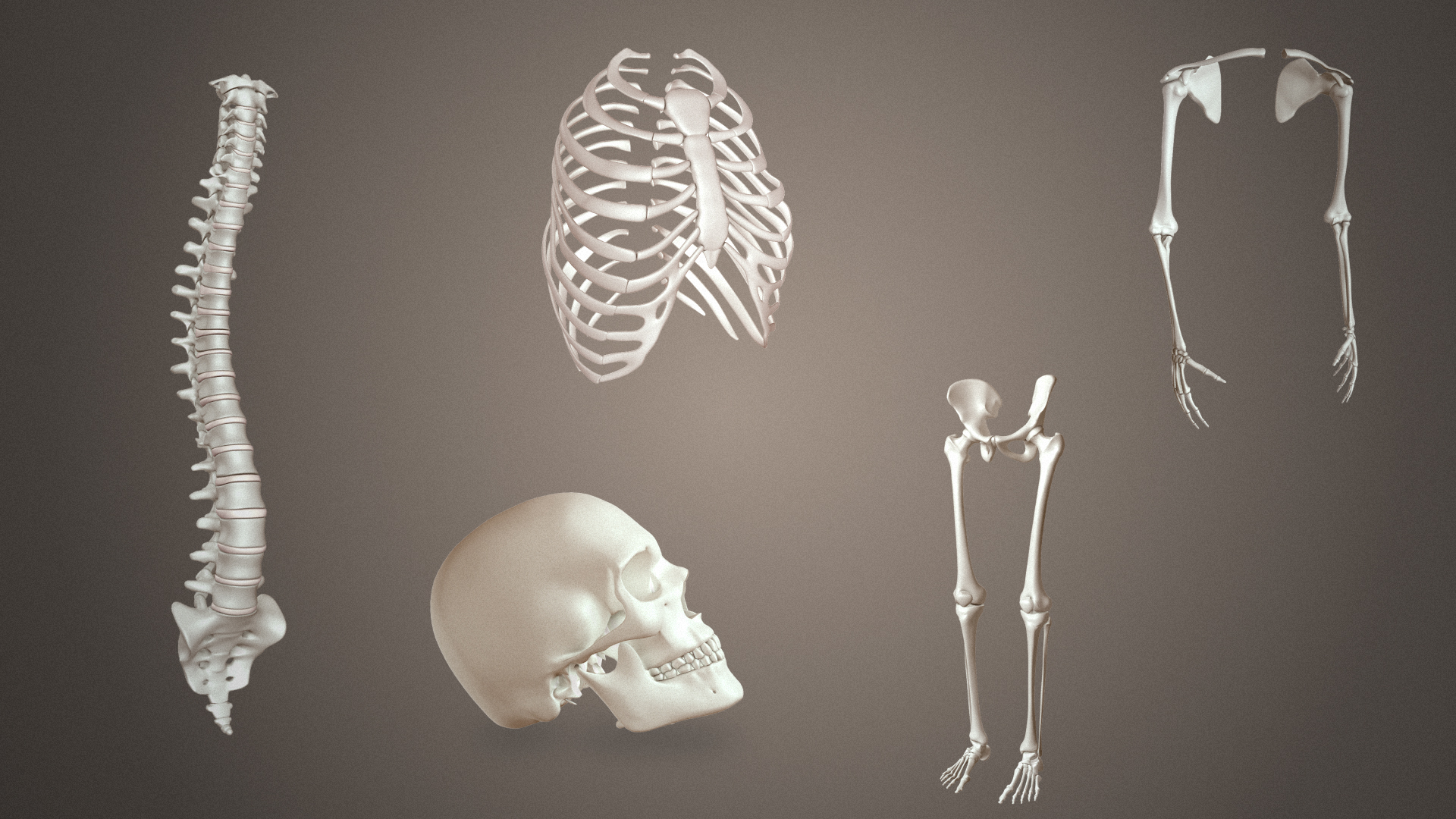
Various bones of the human skeletal system.

The axial skeleton, comprising the spine, chest and head, contains 80 bones. The appendicular skeleton, comprising the upper and lower limbs and including the pelvic and shoulder girdles, contains 126 bones, bringing the total for the entire skeleton to 206 bones.

=== Head ===
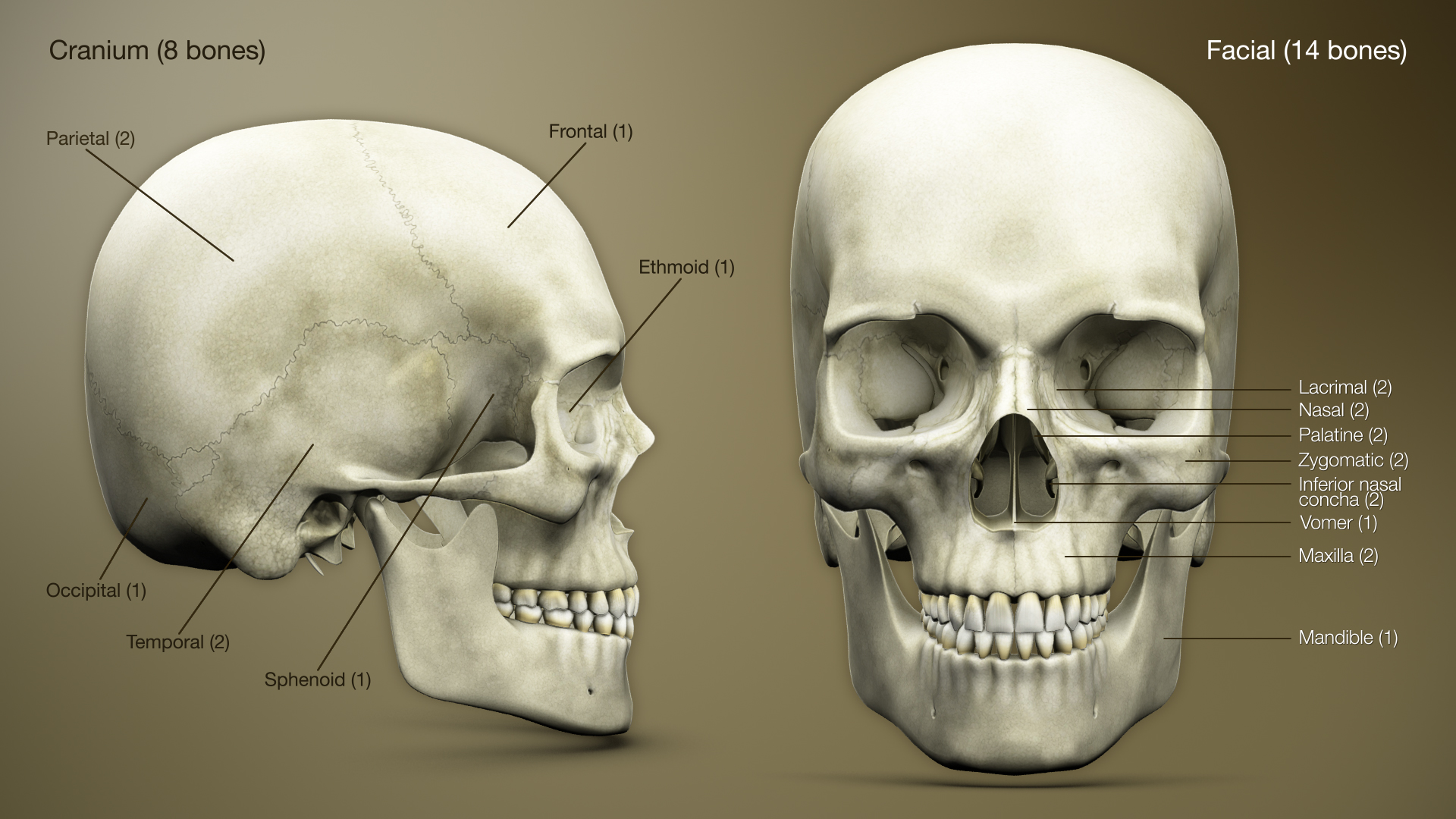
3D Medical Animation still shot of Human Skull

There are 22 bones in the skull. Including the bones of the middle ear and the hyoid bone, there are 29 bones in total.

- Cranial bones (8)
  - Occipital bone (1)
  - Parietal bones (2)
  - Frontal bone (1)
  - Temporal bones (2)
  - Sphenoid bone (1) (sometimes counted as facial)
  - Ethmoid bone (1) (sometimes counted as facial)
- Facial bones (14)
  - Nasal bones (2)
  - Maxilla (2)
  - Lacrimal bones (2)
  - Zygomatic bones (2)
  - Palatine bones (2)
  - Inferior nasal concha bones (2)
  - Vomer (1)
  - Mandible (1)
- Middle ear bones (6)
  - Malleus (2)
  - Incus (2)
  - Stapes (2)
- Hyoid bone (1)

=== Chest (thorax) ===
There are 25 bones in the rib cage. The sternum is composed of three parts (which are fused and not counted separately).

- Sternum (1)
  - Manubrium
  - Gladiolus
  - Xiphoid process
- Ribs - 12 pairs (24)
  - Cervical ribs are extra or supernumerary ribs that can occur pathologically in some people.

=== Spine (vertebral column) ===
An adult spine is composed of 24 vertebrae, the sacrum (formed of five fused vertebrae) and the coccyx ("tailbone", formed of 3-5 fused vertebrae), 26 bones in total.

- Cervical vertebrae (7)
  - Atlas or C1 (1)
  - Axis or C2 (1)
- Thoracic vertebrae (12)
- Lumbar vertebrae (5)
- Sacrum (1)
- Coccyx (1)

=== Pelvis ===
The pelvis consists of, laterally and anteriorly, the pelvic girdle and, posteriorly, the pelvic spine. The pelvic spine, consisting of the sacrum and coccyx, is therefore already accounted for (see above). The pelvic girdle is composed of two appendicular hip bones, each formed of three sections (these are fused and not counted separately).

- Hip bone (Coxal bone) (2)
  - Ilium (2)
  - Ischium (2)
  - Pubis (2)

=== Shoulder ===
The shoulder joint is the articulation of the upper limb with the shoulder girdle. Each shoulder girdle is formed from two bones, the clavicle anteriorly, and the scapula posteriorly.

- Shoulder girdle (4)
  - Clavicle (2)
  - Scapula (2)

=== Upper limb (arm and forearm), and hand ===
Each upper limb comprises 30 bones: 3 long bones of the arm and forearm, and 27 bones of the hand. There are 60 bones in total in the upper limbs.

- Humerus (2)
- Ulna (2)
- Radius (2)
- Hand (27 bones in each, 54 in total)
  - Carpals (8 per wrist, 16 in total)
    - Scaphoid (2)
    - Lunate (2)
    - Triquetrum (2)
    - Pisiform bone (2)
    - Trapezium (2)
    - Trapezoid bone (2)
    - Capitate bone (2)
    - Hamate bone (2)
  - Metacarpals (5 per hand, 10 in total)
    - First metacarpal bone (2)
    - Second metacarpal bone (2)
    - Third metacarpal bone (2)
    - Fourth metacarpal bone (2)
    - Fifth metacarpal bone (2)
  - Phalanges of the hand (14 per hand, 28 in total)
    - Proximal phalanges (5 per hand, 10 in total)
    - Intermediate phalanges (4 per hand, 8 in total)
    - Distal phalanges (5 per hand, 10 in total)

=== Lower limb (thigh and leg) and foot ===
Each lower limb comprises 30 bones: There are a total of 4 bones in the thigh, knee and leg, and 26 in the foot. There are 60 bones in total in the lower limbs.

- Femur (2)
- Patella (2)
- Tibia (2)
- Fibula (2)
- Foot (26 bones per foot, 52 bones in total)
  - Tarsus (7 per foot, 14 in total)
    - Calcaneus or heel bone (2)
    - Talus (2)
    - Navicular bone (2)
    - Medial cuneiform bone (2)
    - Intermediate cuneiform bone (2)
    - Lateral cuneiform bone (2)
    - Cuboid bone (2)
  - Metatarsals (5 per foot, 10 in total)
    - First metatarsal bone (2)
    - Second metatarsal bone (2)
    - Third metatarsal bone (2)
    - Fourth metatarsal bone (2)
    - Fifth metatarsal bone (2)
  - Phalanges of the foot (14 per foot, 28 in total)
    - Proximal phalanges (5 per foot, 10 in total)
    - Intermediate phalanges (4 per foot, 8 in total)
    - Distal phalanges (5 per foot, 10 in total)

== See also ==
- Human body
- Blood vessels
- Circulatory system
- Outline of human anatomy
- List of nerves of the human body
- List of glands of the human body
- List of skeletal muscles of the human body
