= Fourth metatarsal bone =

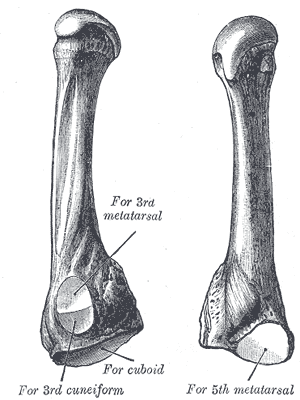
- The fourth metatarsal. (Left.)

- Bones of the right foot. Dorsal surface. Fourth metatarsal bone is the yellow bone second from the right

Details

Identifiers
- Latin: os metatarsale IV
- FMA: 24505

The fourth metatarsal bone is a long bone in the foot. It is smaller in size than the third metatarsal bone and is the third longest (and smallest) of the five metatarsal bones. The fourth metatarsal is analogous to the fourth metacarpal bone in the hand

As the four other metatarsals bones it can be divided into three parts; base, body and head. The base is the part closest to the ankle and the head is closest to the toes. The narrowed part in the middle is referred to as the body or shaft of the bone. The bone is somewhat flatten giving it two surfaces; the plantar (towards the sole of the foot) and the dorsal side (the area facing upwards while standing). These surfaces are rough for the attachment of ligaments. The bone is curved longitudinally, so as to be concave below, slightly convex above.

The base or posterior extremity is wedge-shaped. The base presents an oblique quadrilateral surface for articulation with the cuboid; a smooth facet on the medial side, divided by a ridge into an anterior portion for articulation with the third metatarsal, and a posterior portion for articulation with the third cuneiform; on the lateral side a single facet, for articulation with the fifth metatarsal.

The head or anterior extremity articulates with the fourth proximal phalanx, the first bone in the fourth toe.

== Muscle attachments ==
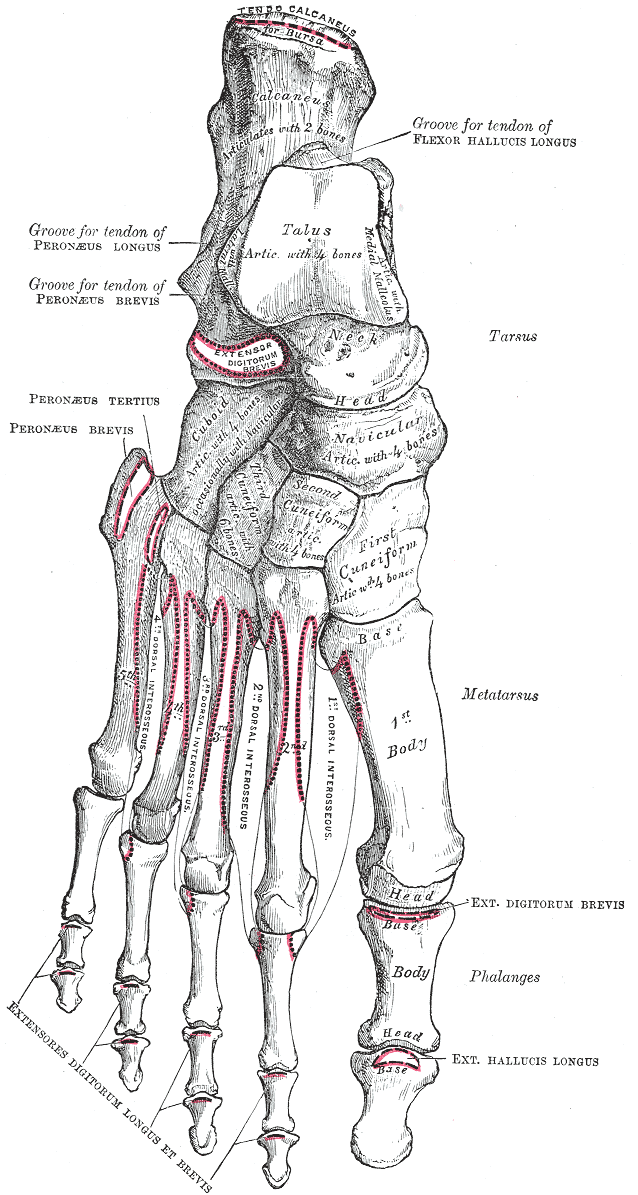
Muscle attachments (seen from above)

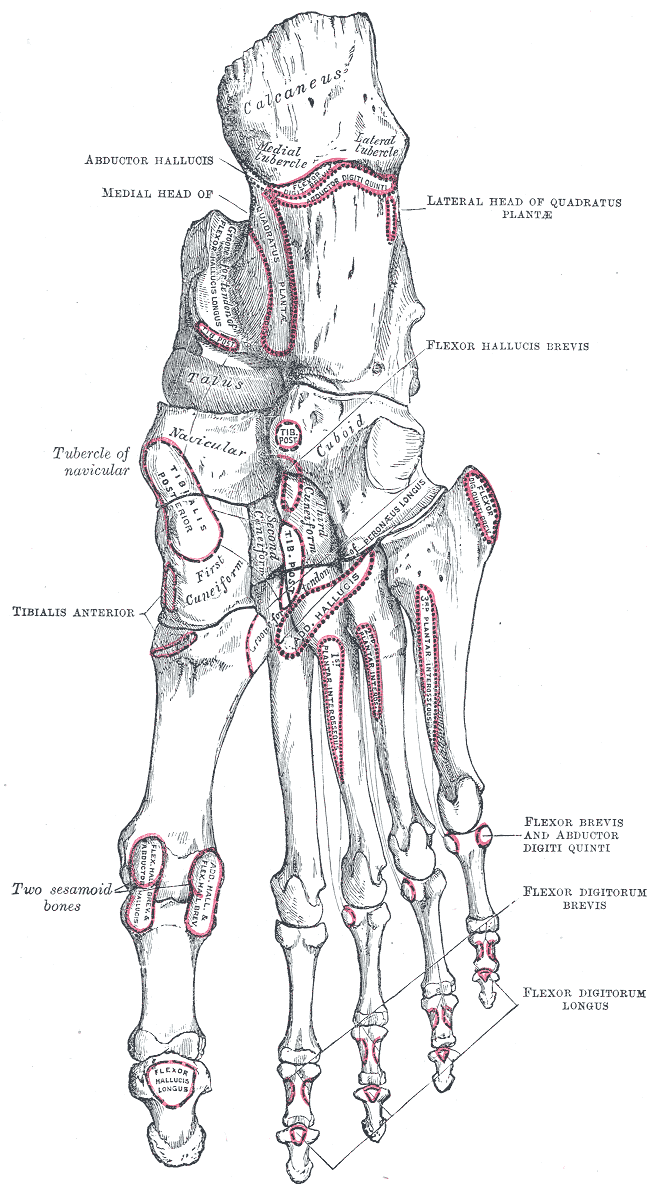
Muscle attachments (seen from belowe)

The third and fourth dorsal interossei muscles attaches to the fourth metatarsal bone. The third dorsal interossei from the medial side of the bone and the fourth dorsal interossei from the lateral side. The function of the muscle is to spread the toes.

The second Plantar interossei muscle originates from the medial side of the base and shaft of the fourth metatarsal. The function of the muscle is to move the fourth toe medially and move the toes together.

The horizontal head of the adductor hallucis also originates from the lateral side of the metacarpophalangeal joint and from the deep transverse metatarsal ligament, a narrow band which runs across and connects together the heads of all the metatarsal bones.

Muscle	Direction	Attachment
Dorsal interossei III	Origin	Medial side of the shaft
Dorsal interossei IV	Origin	Lateral side of the shaft
Plantar interossei II	Origin	Medial side of the base and shaft
Horizontal head of adductor hallucis	Origin	Deep transverse metatarsal ligament and the metacarpophalangeal joint

== Additional images ==
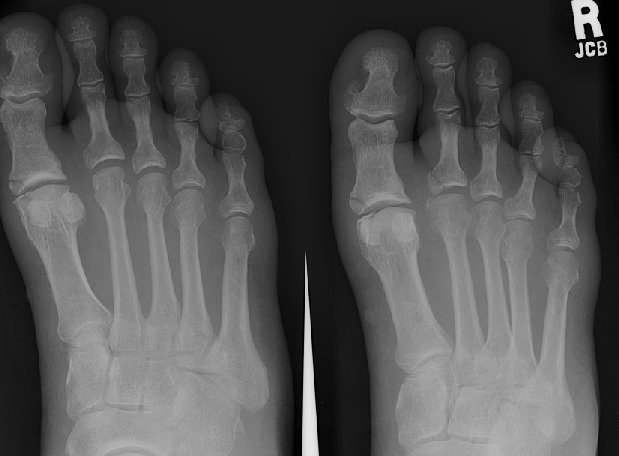
X-ray of foot, showing phalangeal fracture

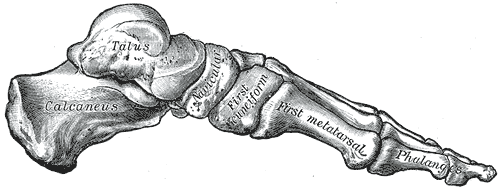
Skeleton of foot. Medial aspect.

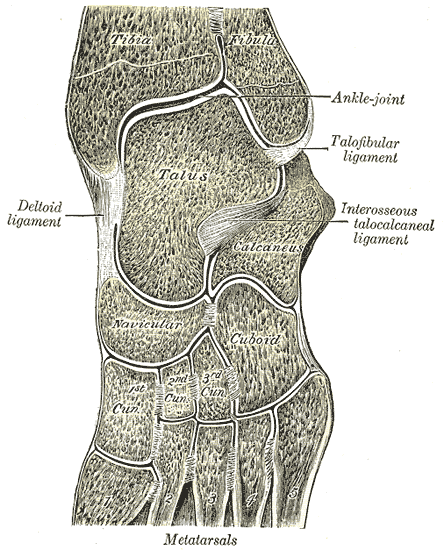
Oblique section of left intertarsal and tarsometatarsal articulations, showing the synovial cavities.

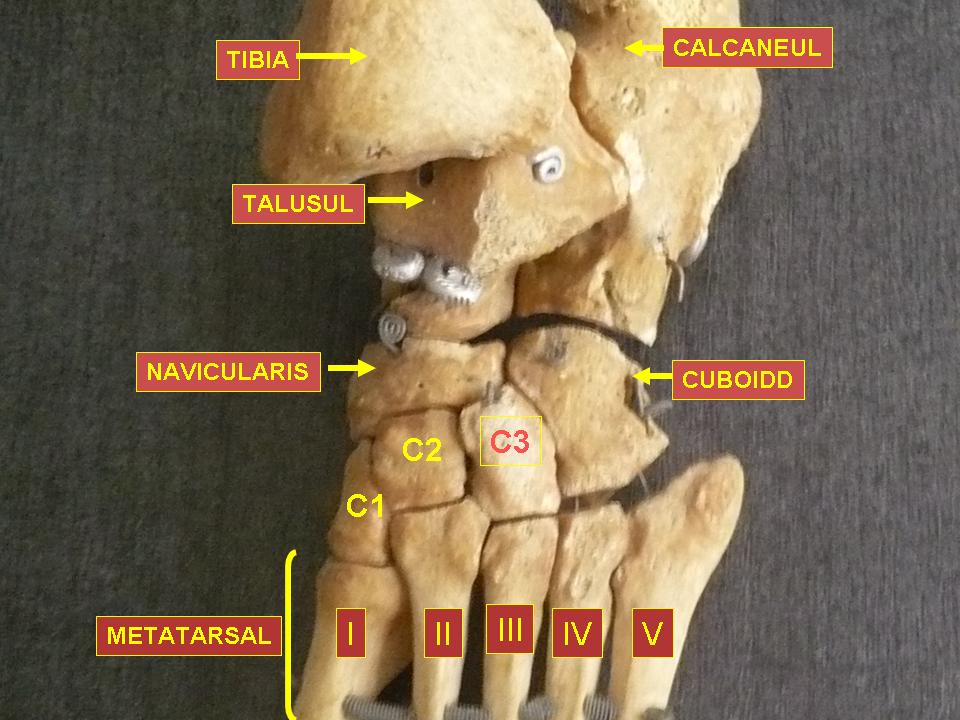
Foot bones - tarsus, metatarsus

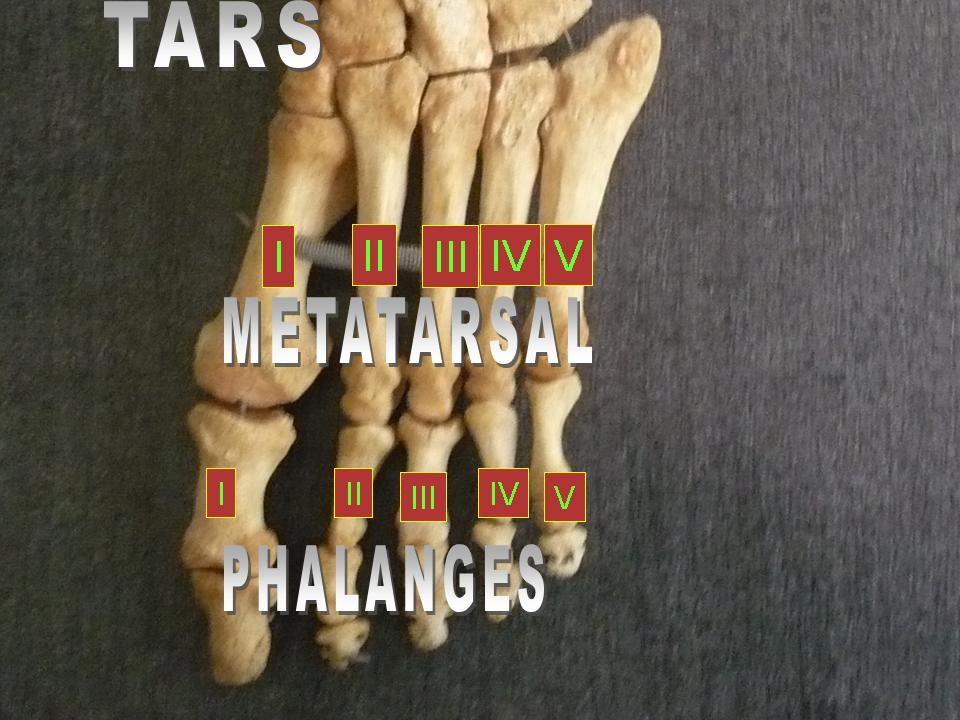
Foot bones - metatarsus and phalanges

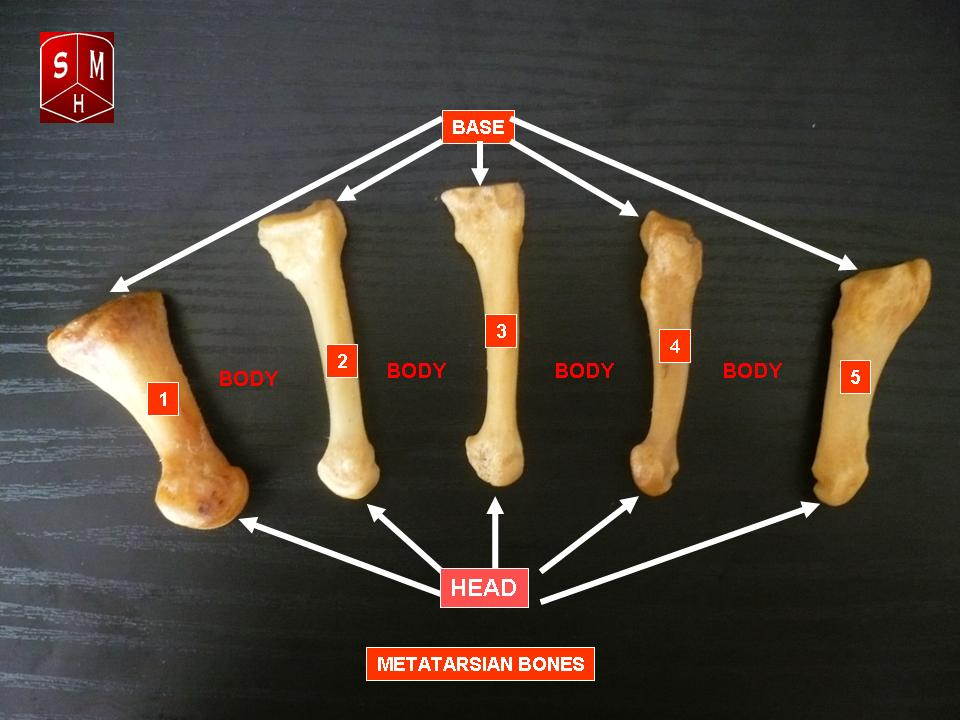
Metatarsus
