= Interossei =

Muscles between certain bones

Interossei refer to muscles between certain bones. There are many interossei in a human body. Specific interossei include:

== On the hands ==
- Dorsal interossei muscles of the hand
- Palmar interossei muscles
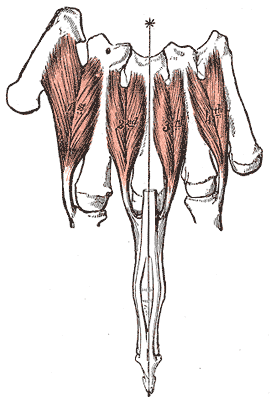
Dorsal interossei muscles of the hand

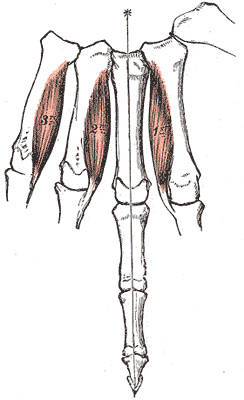
Palmar interossei muscles

== On the feet ==
- Dorsal interossei muscles of the foot
- Plantar interossei muscles
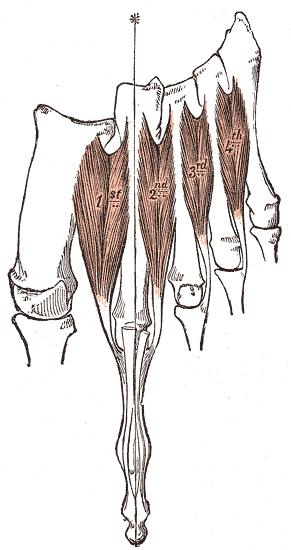
Dorsal interossei muscles of the foot

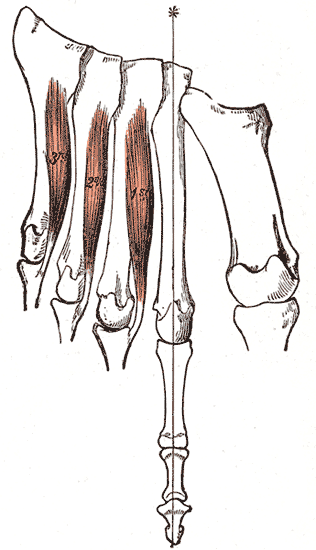
Plantar interossei muscles
