= Third metatarsal bone =

Long bone in the foot

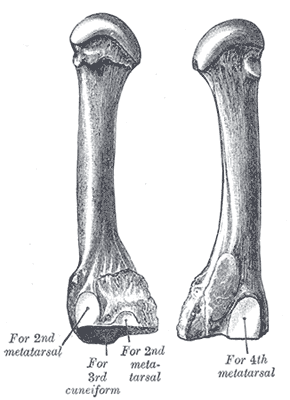
- The third metatarsal. (Left.)

- Bones of the right foot. Dorsal surface. Third metatarsal bone is the yellow bone third from the left

Details

Identifiers
- Latin: os metatarsale III
- FMA: 24504

The third metatarsal bone is a long bone in the foot. It is the second longest metatarsal, the longest being the second metatarsal. The third metatarsal is analogous to the third metacarpal bone in the hand

Like the four other metatarsal bones, it can be divided into three part: base, body and head. The base is the part closest to the ankle and the head is closest to the toes. The narrowed part in the middle is referred to as the body of the bone. The bone is somewhat flattened, giving it two surfaces: the plantar (towards the sole of the foot) and the dorsal side (the area facing upwards while standing). These surfaces are rough for the attachment of ligaments. The bone is curved longitudinally, so as to be concave below, and slightly convex above.

The base or posterior extremity is wedge-shaped. The third metatarsal bone articulates proximally, by means of a triangular smooth surface, with the third cuneiform; medially, by two facets, with the second metatarsal; and laterally, by a single facet, with the fourth metatarsal. This last facet is situated at the dorsal angle of the base.

The head or anterior extremity articulates with the third proximal phalanx.

== Muscle attachments ==
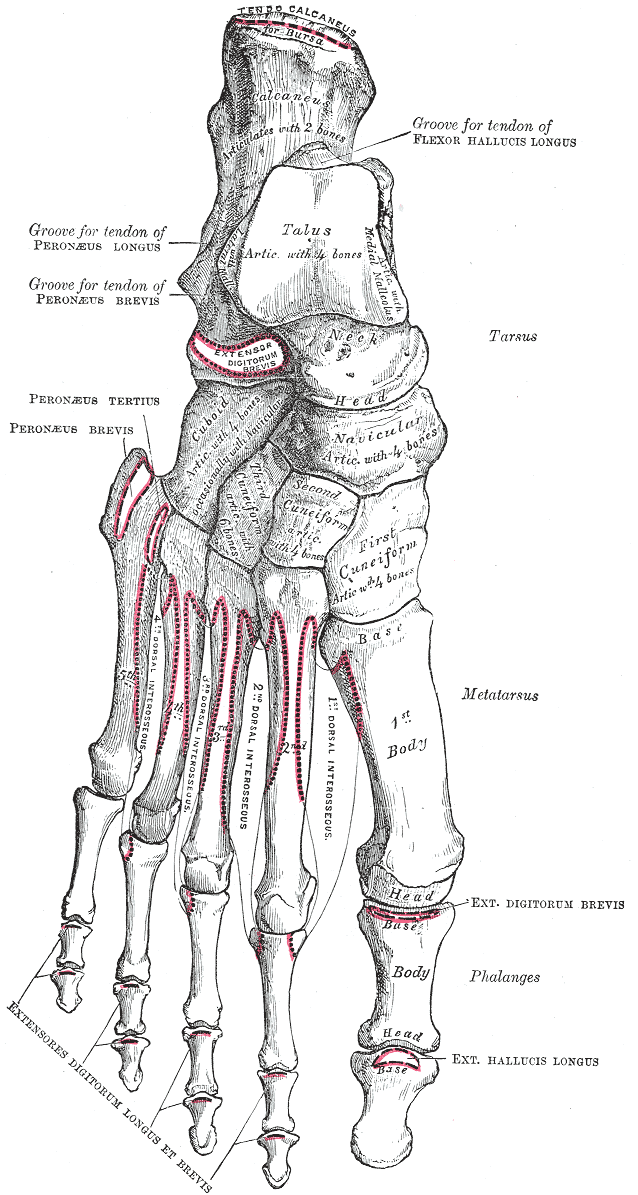
Muscle attachments (seen from above)

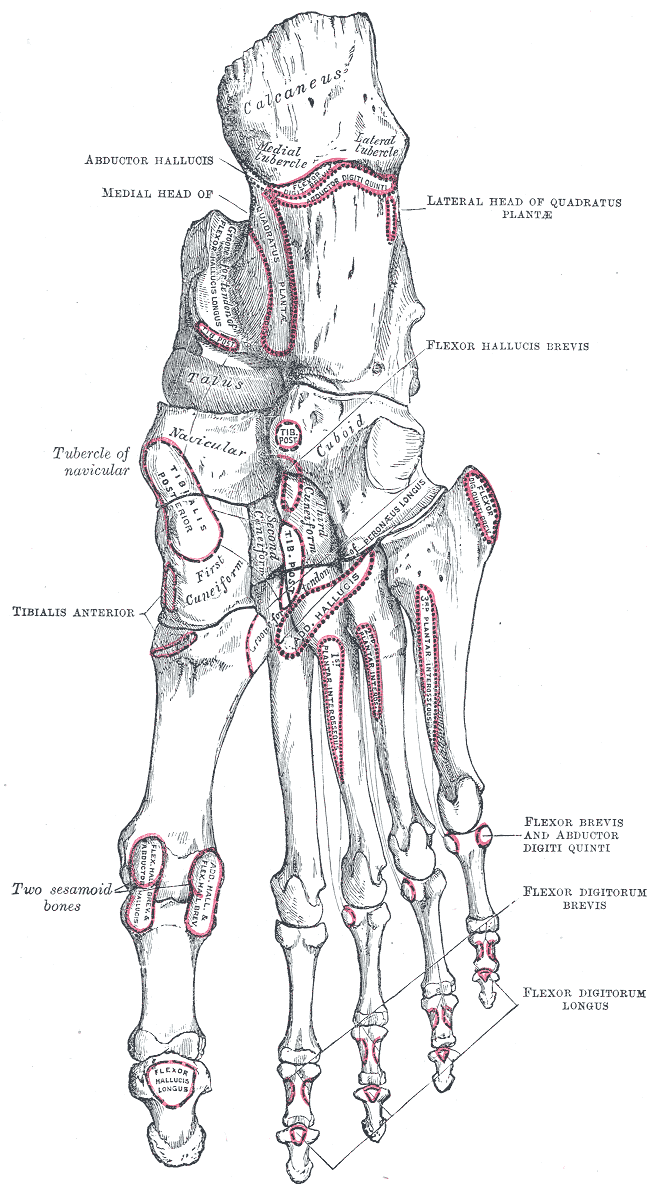
Muscle attachments (seen from below)

The second and third dorsal interossei muscles attaches to the third metatarsal bone. The second dorsal interossei from the medial side of the bone and the third dorsal interossei from the lateral side. The function of the muscle is to spread the toes.

The first Plantar interossei muscle originates from the medial side of the base and shaft of the third metatarsal. The function of the muscle is to move the third toe medially and move the toes together.

The horizontal head of the adductor hallucis also originates from the lateral side of the metacarpophalangeal joint and from the deep transverse metatarsal ligament, a narrow band which runs across and connects together the heads of all the metatarsal bones.

Muscle	Direction	Attachment
Dorsal interossei II	Origin	Medial side of the shaft
Dorsal interossei III	Origin	Lateral side of the shaft
Plantar interossei I	Origin	Medial side of the base and shaft
Horizontal head of adductor hallucis	Origin	Deep transverse metatarsal ligament and the metacarpophalangeal joint

== Additional images ==
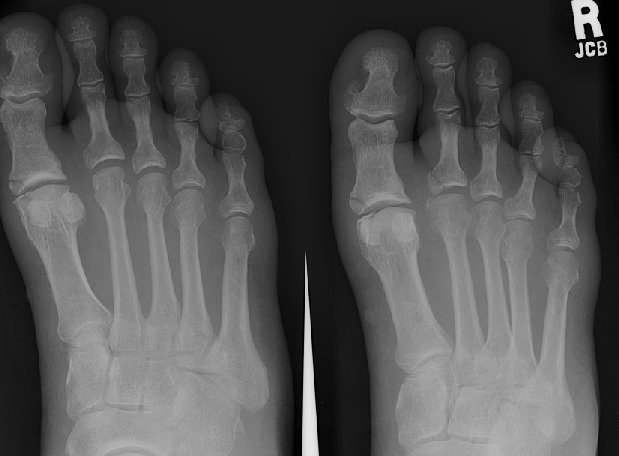
X-ray of foot, showing phalangeal fracture

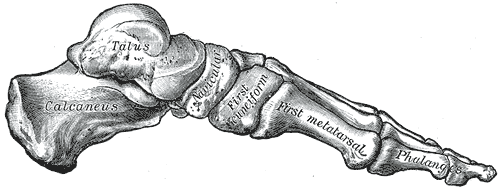
Skeleton of foot. Medial aspect.

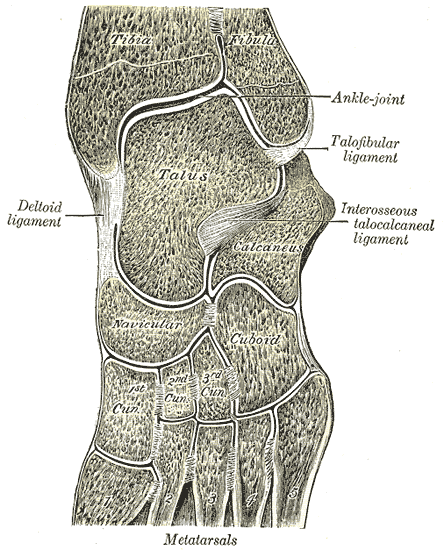
Oblique section of left intertarsal and tarsometatarsal articulations, showing the synovial cavities.

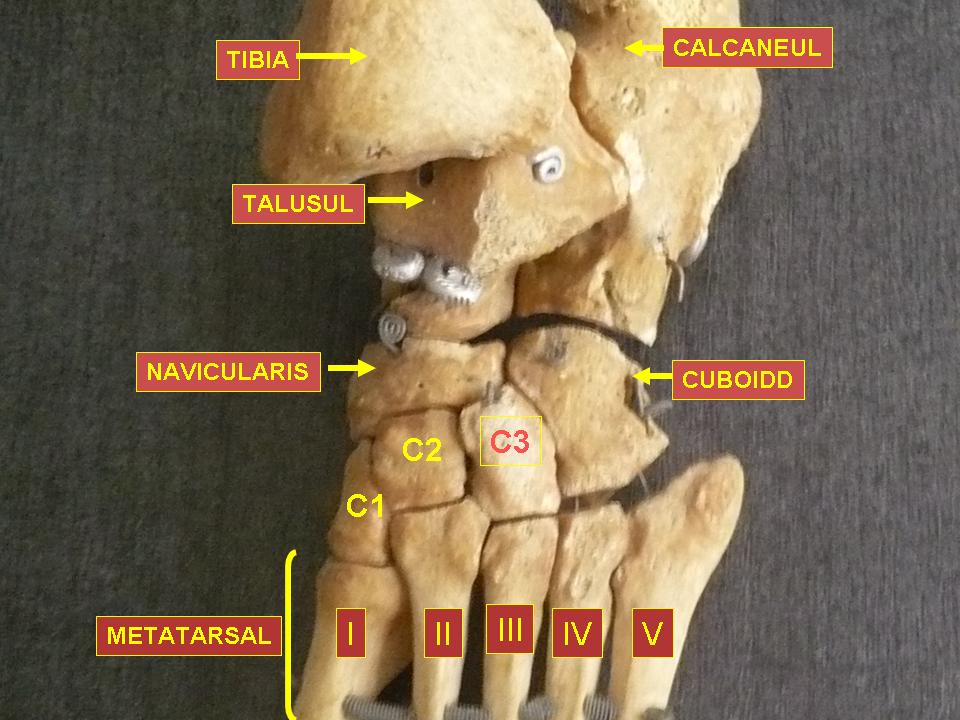
Foot bones - tarsus, metatarsus

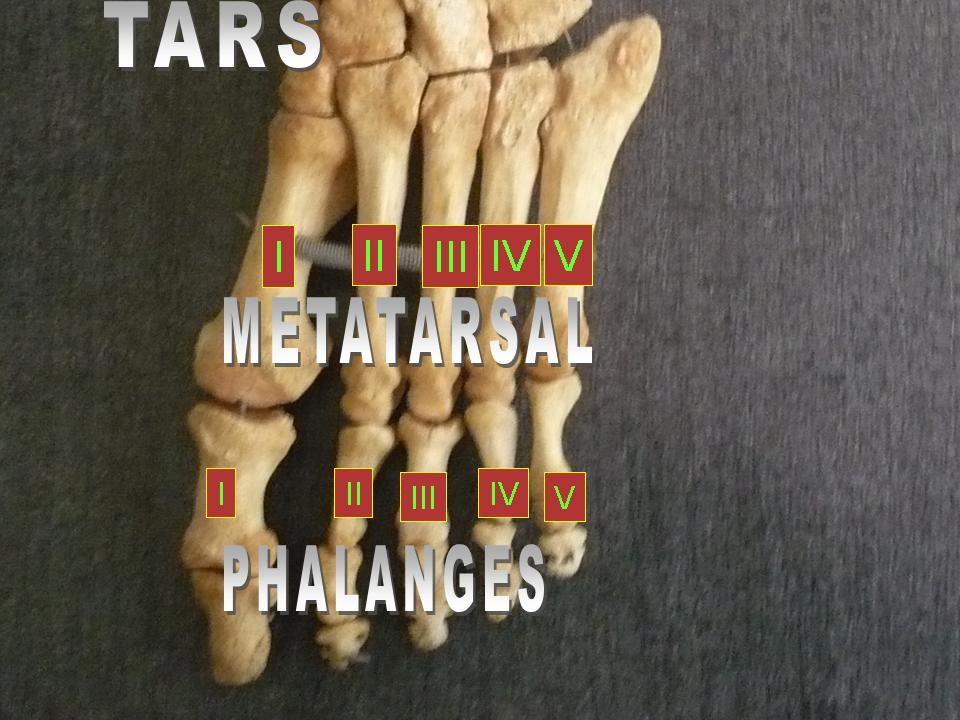
Foot bones - metatarsus and phalanges

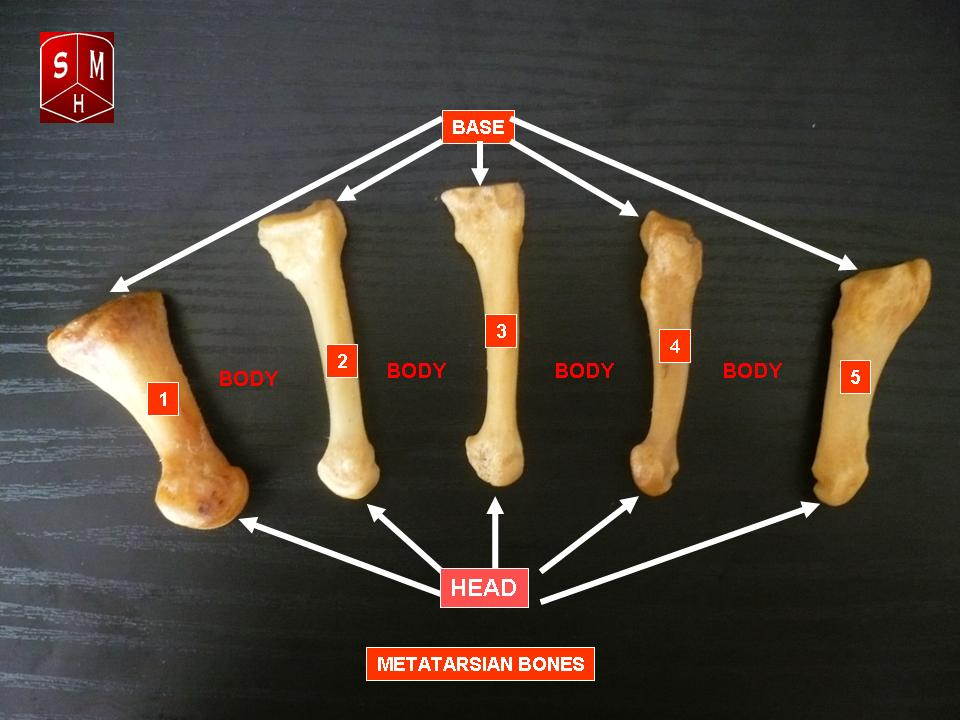
Metatarsus
