= Second metatarsal bone =

Long bone in the foot

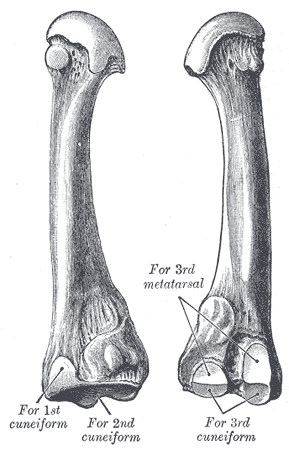
- The second metatarsal. (Left.)

- Bones of the right foot. Dorsal surface. Second metatarsal bone is the yellow bone second from the left

Details

Identifiers
- Latin: os metatarsale II
- FMA: 24503

The second metatarsal bone is a long bone in the foot. It is the longest of the metatarsal bones, being prolonged backward and held firmly into the recess formed by the three cuneiform bones. The second metatarsal forms joints with the second proximal phalanx (a bone in the second toe) through the metatarsophalangeal joint, the cuneiform bones, third metatarsal and occasionally the first metatarsal bone.

== Structure ==
Like the four other metatarsal bones, it can be divided into three parts: base, body and head. The base is the part closest to the ankle and the head is closest to the big toe. The narrowed part in the middle is referred to as the body of the bone. The bone is somewhat flattened, giving it two sides: the plantar (towards the sole of the foot) and the dorsal side (the area facing upwards while standing).

Its base is broad above, narrow and rough below.

It presents four articular surfaces: one behind, of a triangular form, for articulation with the intermediate cuneiform bone; one at the upper part of its medial surface, for articulation with the medial cuneiform; and two on its lateral surface, an upper and lower, separated by a rough non-articular interval. Each of these lateral articular surfaces is divided into two by a vertical ridge: the two anterior facets articulate with the third metatarsal and the two posterior (sometimes continuous) with the lateral cuneiform. A fifth facet is occasionally present for articulation with the first metatarsal; it is oval in shape, and is situated on the medial side of the body near the base.

The second metatarsal base acts as a "keystone" (like in an arch) for the lisfranc joint.

== Muscle attachments ==
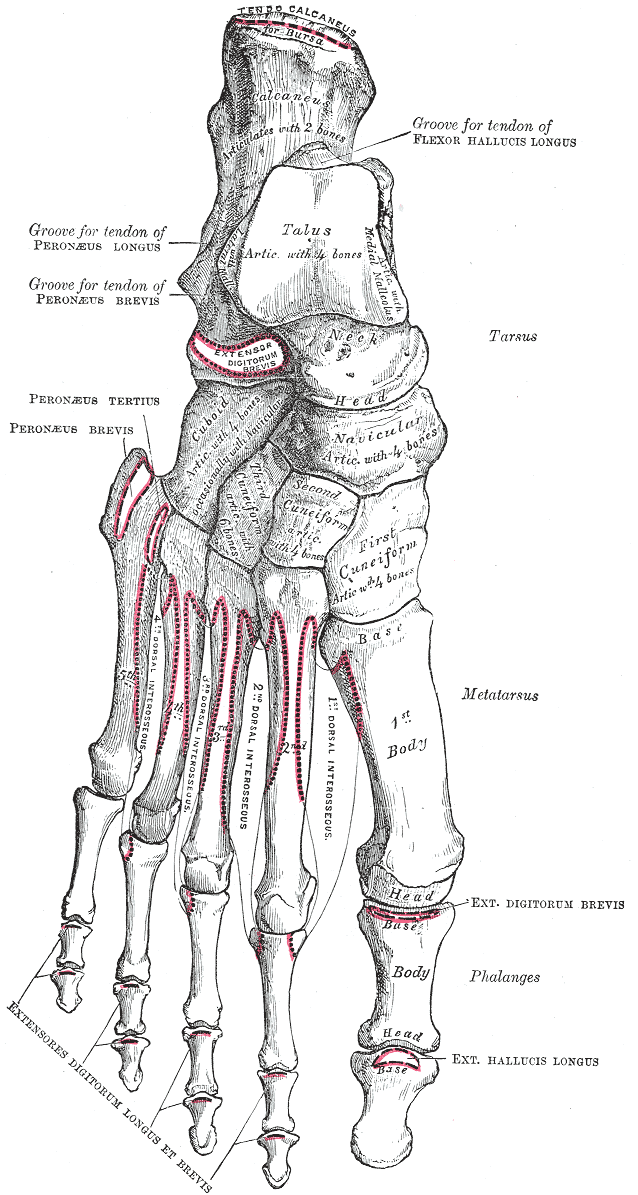
Muscle attachments (seen from above)

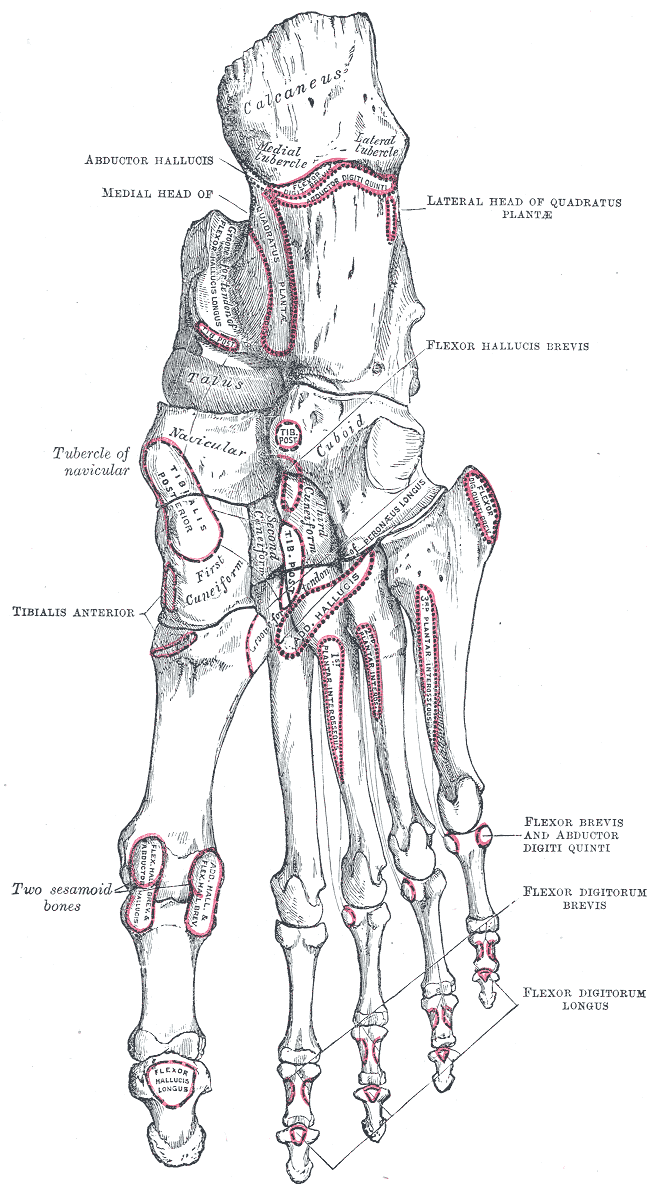
Muscle attachments (seen from below)

The first and second dorsal interossei muscles attach to the second metatarsal bone, the first dorsal interosseus from the medial side of the bone and the second dorsal interosseus from the lateral side. The function of the muscle is to spread the toes.

The horizontal head of the adductor hallucis also originates from the lateral side of the metatarsophalangeal joint and from the deep transverse metatarsal ligament, a narrow band which runs across and connects together the heads of all the metatarsal bones.

Muscle	Direction	Attachment
Dorsal interossei I	Origin	Medial side of the second metatarsal
Dorsal interossei II	Origin	Lateral side of the second metatarsal
Horizontal head of adductor hallucis	Origin	Deep transverse metatarsal ligament and the metatarsophalangeal joint

== Related Conditions ==
Second metatarsal bone elongation, also known as Morton's toe (or Morton's foot) is a normal variation of the second metatarsal present in about 25% of the total population. Although normal, Morton's toe causes extra-inversion of the foot and thereby puts more stress on the lateral part of the meniscus of the knee, promotes lordosis of the lower back (lumbar spine) and kyphosis of the neck (cervical spine). Symptoms include back pain, knee pain and arthritis at early age, constant tenderness of shoulder, both acute and chronic torticollis, headache and up to vague non-specific bodyaches.

== Injuries ==
The Beckham bone is a name attributed by British journalists to the second metatarsal.

David Beckham, while playing for Manchester United against Deportivo La Coruña in a UEFA Champions League quarter-final game in 2002, was subject to a tackle from Argentina's Aldo Duscher. (A lot of acrimony had existed between David Beckham and Argentina since David Beckham's sending off in the 1998 World Cup). This tackle broke the second metatarsal in his left foot and seriously threatened England's chances in the 2002 World Cup. David Beckham was the media darling at the time, and the bone (and the tackle) received a wave of publicity; subsequently, the name "Beckham bone" was born.

Since then, other notable football players including Daniel Agger, Gary Neville, Danny Murphy, Michael Owen, Gaël Clichy, Ashley Cole, Ledley King, Mikaël Silvestre, James Mathias and Lionel Messi have suffered fractures to the same 2nd metatarsal bone.

== Additional images ==
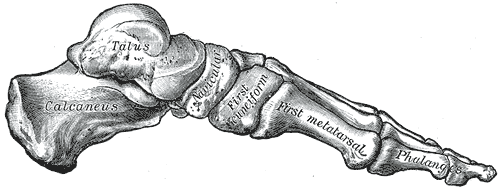
Skeleton of foot. Medial aspect.

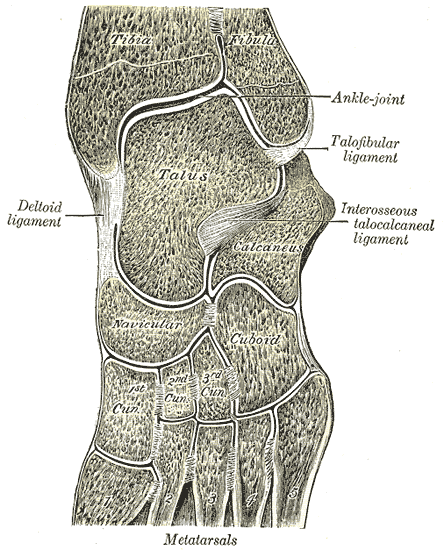
Oblique section of left intertarsal and tarsometatarsal articulations, showing the synovial cavities.

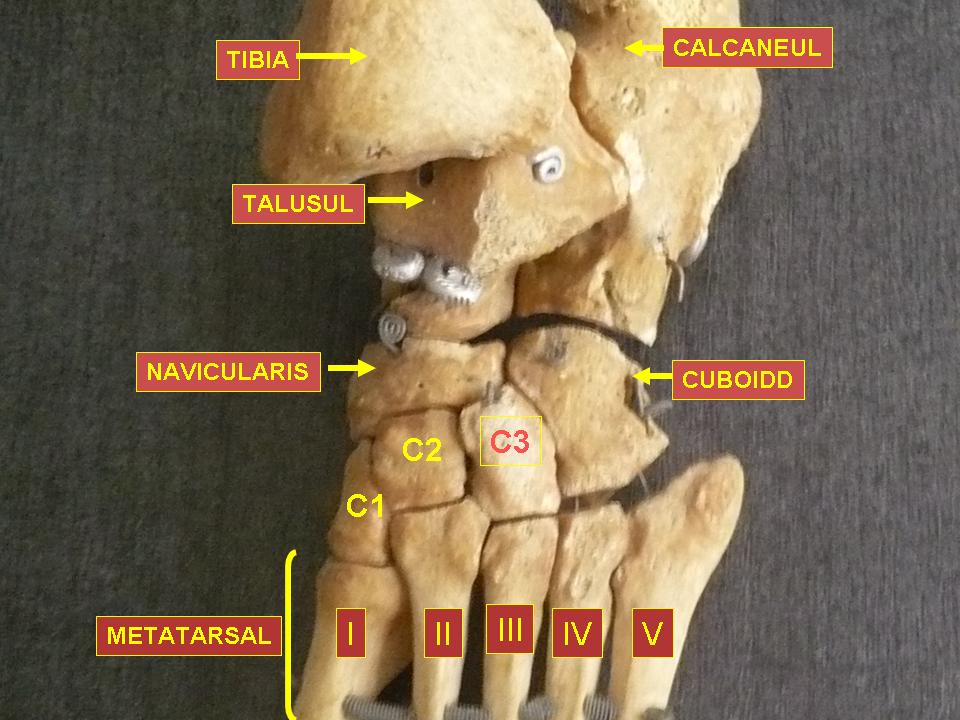
Foot bones - tarsus, metatarsus

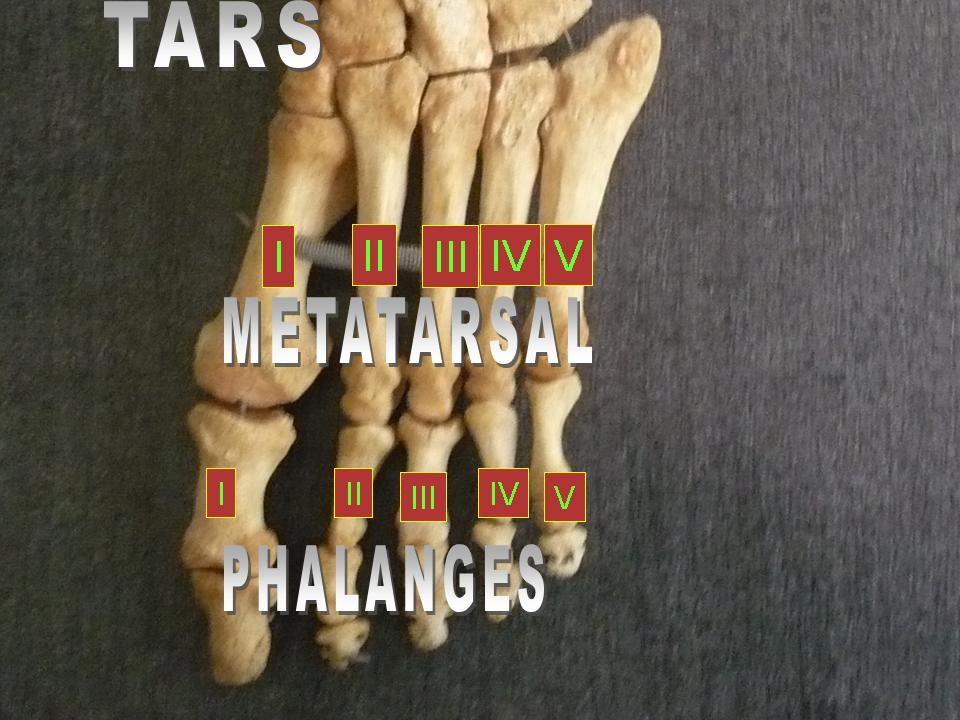
Foot bones - metatarsus and phalanges

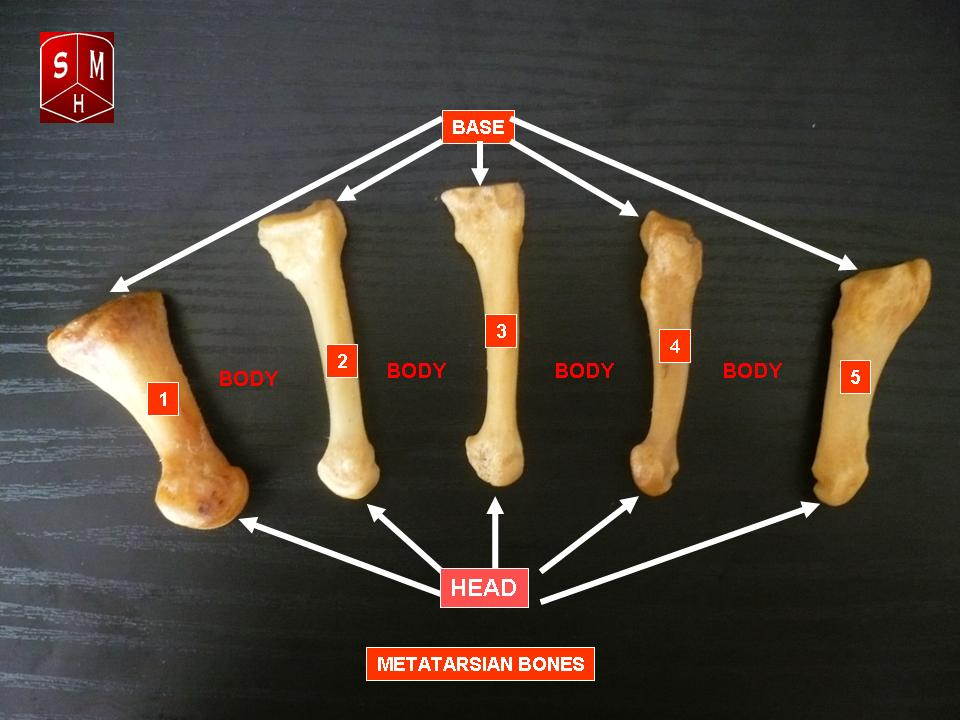
Metatarsus
