= Palmar interossei muscles =

Muscles between the metacarpals

Details
- Origin: Sides of metacarpals facing midline
- Insertion: Bases of proximal phalanges, extensor expansions
- Artery: Palmar metacarpal artery of deep palmar arch
- Nerve: Deep branch of ulnar nerve
- Actions: Adduction, flexion and extension
- Antagonist: Dorsal interossei

Identifiers
- Latin: musculi interossei palmares
- TA98: A04.6.02.067
- TA2: 2534
- FMA: 37419

In human anatomy, the palmar or volar interossei (interossei volares in older literature) are four muscles, one on the thumb that is occasionally missing, and three small, unipennate, central muscles in the hand that lie between the metacarpal bones and are attached to the index, ring, and little fingers. They are smaller than the dorsal interossei of the hand.

== Structure ==
All palmar interossei originate along the shaft of the metacarpal bone of the digit on which they act. They are inserted into the base of the proximal phalanx and the extensor expansion of the extensor digitorum of the same digit.

=== Pollical palmar interosseous ===
The first palmar interosseous is located at the thumb's medial side. Passing between the first dorsal interosseous and the oblique head of adductor pollicis, it is inserted on the base of the thumb's proximal phalanx together with adductor pollicis.

The "pollical" palmar interosseous muscle (PPIM), is present in more than 80% of individuals and was first described by Henle 1858. Its presence has been verified by numerous anatomists since, but others have either failed to mention it or considered it part of either adductor pollicis or flexor pollicis brevis. However, the deep head of the flexor pollicis brevis originates on the thumb's ulnar sesamoid bone and the oblique portion of the adductor pollicis on several carpal bones, as well as the bases of the second and third metacarpal bones and not on the first metacarpal.

=== Central palmar interossei ===
The other three palmar interossei originate on the side of the metacarpal facing the hand's midline (ray of long finger); the second is attached to the medial side of the index finger; the third to the lateral side of the ring finger; and the fourth to the lateral side of the little finger. The tendons of these three muscles pass posterior to the deep transverse ligament before being inserted onto the extensor expansion.

=== Innervation ===
All of the interosseous muscles of the hand are innervated by the deep branch of the ulnar nerve.

=== Blood supply ===
The palmar interossei are supplied by the palmar metacarpal artery of the deep palmar arch.

== Function ==
The palmar interosseous muscles adduct the fingers towards the middle finger. This is in contrast to the dorsal interossei, which abduct the fingers away from the middle finger. In addition (like dorsal interossei) they flex the finger at the metacarpo-phalangeal joint and extend the finger at the interphalangeal joint and thus assist the lumbricals.

The palmar interossei, together with the dorsal interossei and the lumbricals, are active components of the finger's extensor mechanism. Fibers from some of the interossei contribute directly to the extensor hoods that wrap around the proximal phalanges, while other fibers may contribute to the central tendon and lateral bands of the mechanism. All three intrinsic groups of muscles pass palmar to the axis of the metacarpophalangeal joints, and therefore contribute to flexion there. Extension at the interphalangeal joints cannot be produced by the extensor digitorum alone, but active contraction of one of the three aforementioned intrinsic groups will because of their direct contribution to the extensor mechanism.

== Other animals ==
The pollical palmar interosseous muscle (PPIM) is absent in non-human primates, and is probably an autapomorphic muscle unique to the human thumb (together with flexor pollicis longus) which probably evolved from the oblique portion of adductor pollicis. In African apes, adductor pollicis is notably well-developed, with an origin on the carpus and its ligaments, and an insertion that has migrated distally, in some cases as far as the distal phalanx. The insertion of the PPIM into the extensor mechanism is likely to have evolved with tool usage in early hominids. As comparative anatomy studies of the human PPIM strongly suggest that the muscle is evolutionarily derived from the adductor pollicis, it has been proposed that PPIM should be designated by the name musculus adductor pollicis accessorius, which indicates that the muscle is most likely a de novo structure derived from the adductor pollicis.

== Additional images ==
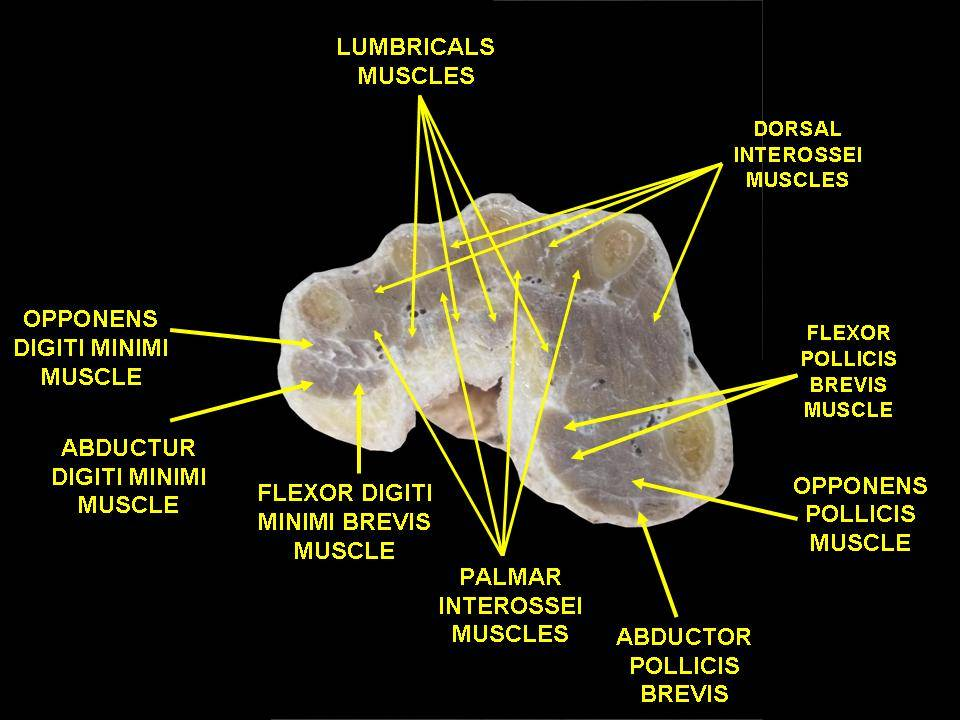
Muscles of hand. Cross section.

== See also ==
- Interosseous muscles of the hand
  - Dorsal interossei of the hand
- Interosseous muscles of the foot
  - Dorsal interossei of the foot
  - Plantar interossei muscles
