= Dorsal interossei of the hand =

Muscles between the metacarpals

Details
- Origin: Metacarpals
- Insertion: Proximal phalanges and extensor expansions
- Artery: Dorsal and palmar metacarpal artery
- Nerve: Deep branch of ulnar nerve
- Actions: Abduct finger
- Antagonist: Palmar interossei

Identifiers
- Latin: musculi interossei dorsales manus
- TA98: A04.6.02.066
- TA2: 2533
- FMA: 37418

In human anatomy, the dorsal interossei (DI) are four muscles in the back of the hand that act to abduct (spread) the index, middle, and ring fingers away from the hand's midline (ray of middle finger) and assist in flexion at the metacarpophalangeal joints and extension at the interphalangeal joints of the index, middle, and ring fingers.

== Structure ==
There are four dorsal interossei in each hand. They are specified as 'dorsal' to contrast them with the palmar interossei, which are located on the anterior side of the metacarpals.

Anatomically, the dorsal interosseous muscles are bipennate, with each muscle arising by two heads from the adjacent sides of the metacarpal bones, but more extensively from the metacarpal bone of the finger into which the muscle is inserted. They are inserted into the bases of the proximal phalanges and into the extensor expansion of the corresponding extensor digitorum tendon. The middle digit has two dorsal interossei insert onto it while the first digit (thumb) and the fifth digit (little finger) have none. Additionally, each finger is provided with two interossei (palmar or dorsal), with the exception of the little finger, in which the abductor digiti minimi muscle takes the place of one of the dorsal interossei.

The first dorsal interosseous muscle is larger than the others. Between its two heads, the radial artery passes from the back of the hand into the palm. Additionally, between the heads of dorsal interossei two, three, and four, a perforating branch from the deep palmar arch is transmitted.

=== Origins and insertions ===
	Origin	Insertion
first	on the radial side of the second metacarpal and the proximal half of the ulnar side of the first metacarpal	on the radial side of the base of the second proximal phalanx (index finger) and the extensor expansion
second	on the radial side of the third metacarpal and the ulnar side of the second metacarpal	on the radial side of the third proximal phalanx (the middle finger) and the extensor expansion
third	on the radial side of the fourth metacarpal and the ulnar side of the third metacarpal	on the ulnar side of the third proximal phalanx (the middle finger) and the extensor expansion
fourth	on the radial side of the fifth metacarpal and the ulnar side of the fourth metacarpal	on the ulnar side of the fourth proximal phalanx (the ring finger) and the extensor expansion

=== Proximal and distal interossei ===
With some individual variations, the interossei muscles are attached either proximally or distally on the extensor expansion. The first dorsal interosseous, the most consistent, is inserted entirely into the base of its proximal phalanx and the extensor hood there. The second, third, and fourth dorsal interossei have insertions both proximally on the base of the metacarpal and hood, and distally on the lateral bands and central tendon of the extensor mechanism. The abductor digiti minimi, effectively the "fifth dorsal interosseus" or the dorsal interosseus of the little finger, has only a proximal insertion. The palmar interossei, in contrast, have only distal insertions. Consequently, the interossei can, thus, be divided into a proximal and a distal group: the proximal interossei are mainly affecting the metacarpophalangeal (MP) joints, whereas the distal interossei are mainly affecting the interphalangeal (IP) joints (but, with continued action, will also affect the MP joints.)

=== Innervation ===
All interosseous muscles of the hand are innervated by the deep branch of the ulnar nerve.

== Function ==
The dorsal interossei abduct the index, middle, and ring fingers. The first dorsal interosseous is also able to rotate the index finger slightly at the metacarpophalangeal joint and assist adductor pollicis in thumb adduction.

=== Metacarpophalangeal joint flexion ===
All interossei pass dorsal to the transverse metacarpal ligament but slightly volar to the flexion-extension axes of rotation of the MP joints. In effect, their ability to flex at the MP joints will depend on the position of the MP joints:

When the MP joints are extended, all interossei pass through the flexion-extension axes of the MP joints and their contribution there is therefore negligible, though they still play important roles as joint stabilizers (i.e. preventing MP hyperextension). At the same time, the interossei (and abductor digiti minimi) lie relatively far from the anterior-posterior axis of the MP joints and are consequently effective abductors and adductors during MP extension. Because the dorsal interossei are predominantly in the proximal group they are more effective at the MP joints than the palmar interossei and, therefore, abduction is stronger than adduction at the MP joints.

When the MP joints are being flexed, the position of the interossei moves away volarly from the flexion-extension axes of the MP joints until they are nearly perpendicular to the proximal phalanx. At the same time, the increasingly taut collateral ligaments of the MP joints cancel out the abduction-adduction component to increase the force of flexion (resulting in a strong grip). At full flexion, the transverse metacarpal ligament restricts the interossei.

=== Interphalangeal joint extension ===
When the MP joints are extended, effective IP joint extension can be done by all interossei in the distal group (i.e. all except the two outermost muscles, the first interosseus and abductor digiti minimi) because they are attached directly to the extension mechanism. This IP extension is therefore stronger than MP abduction/adduction which is produced by continued action except for the index and little fingers.

When the MP joints are flexed, the transverse metacarpal ligament enhances the function of the distal interossei by acting as a pulley and preventing them from becoming slack, further increasing the effectiveness of IP extension.

== Clinical relevance ==
=== First dorsal interosseous compartment syndrome ===
Compartment syndrome rarely occurs in the first dorsal interosseous compartment of hand. This condition is caused by excessive use of hand, resulting in pain and swelling on the dorsum of the hand. It can be treated by simple fasciotomy.

== Additional images ==
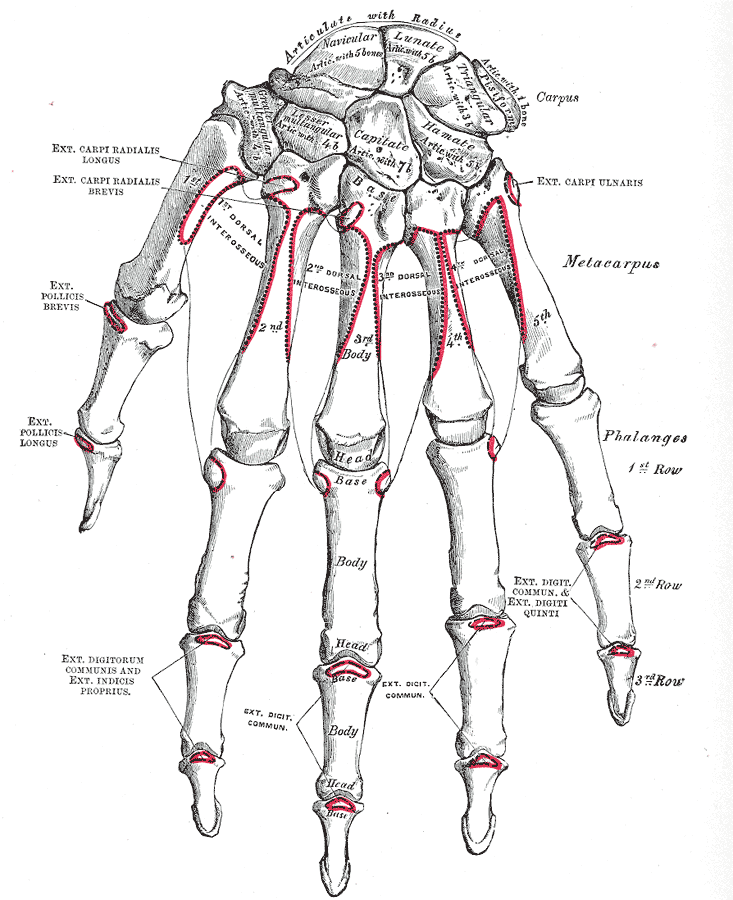
Bones of the left hand. Dorsal surface.

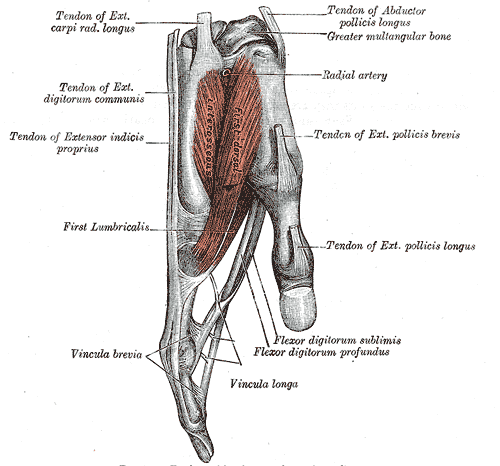
First dorsal interossei

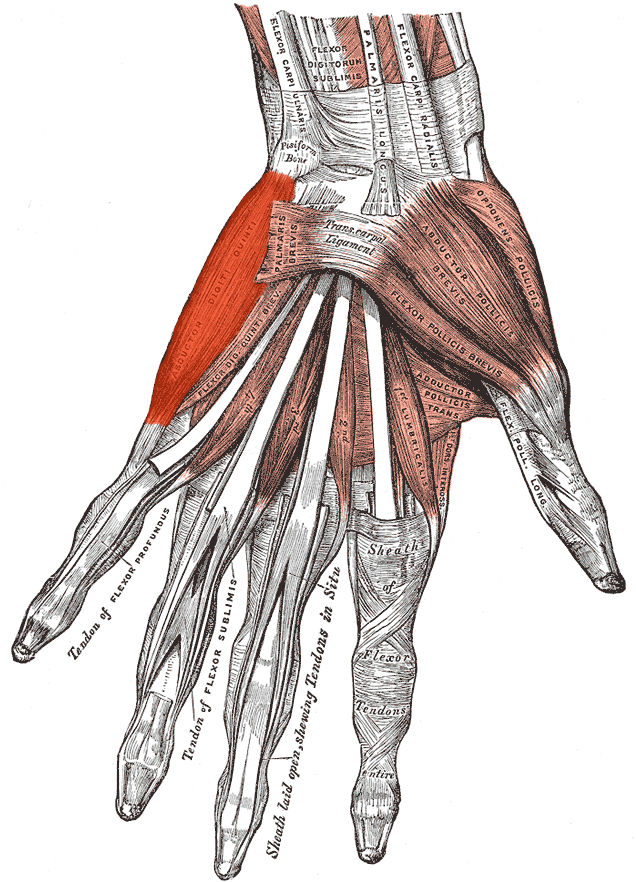
Abductor digiti minimi, the "fifth dorsal interosseus"

== See also ==
- Interosseous muscles of the hand
  - Palmar interossei muscles
- Interosseous muscles of the foot
  - Dorsal interossei of the foot
  - Plantar interossei muscles
