= Metatarsal bones =

Five long bones in the foot

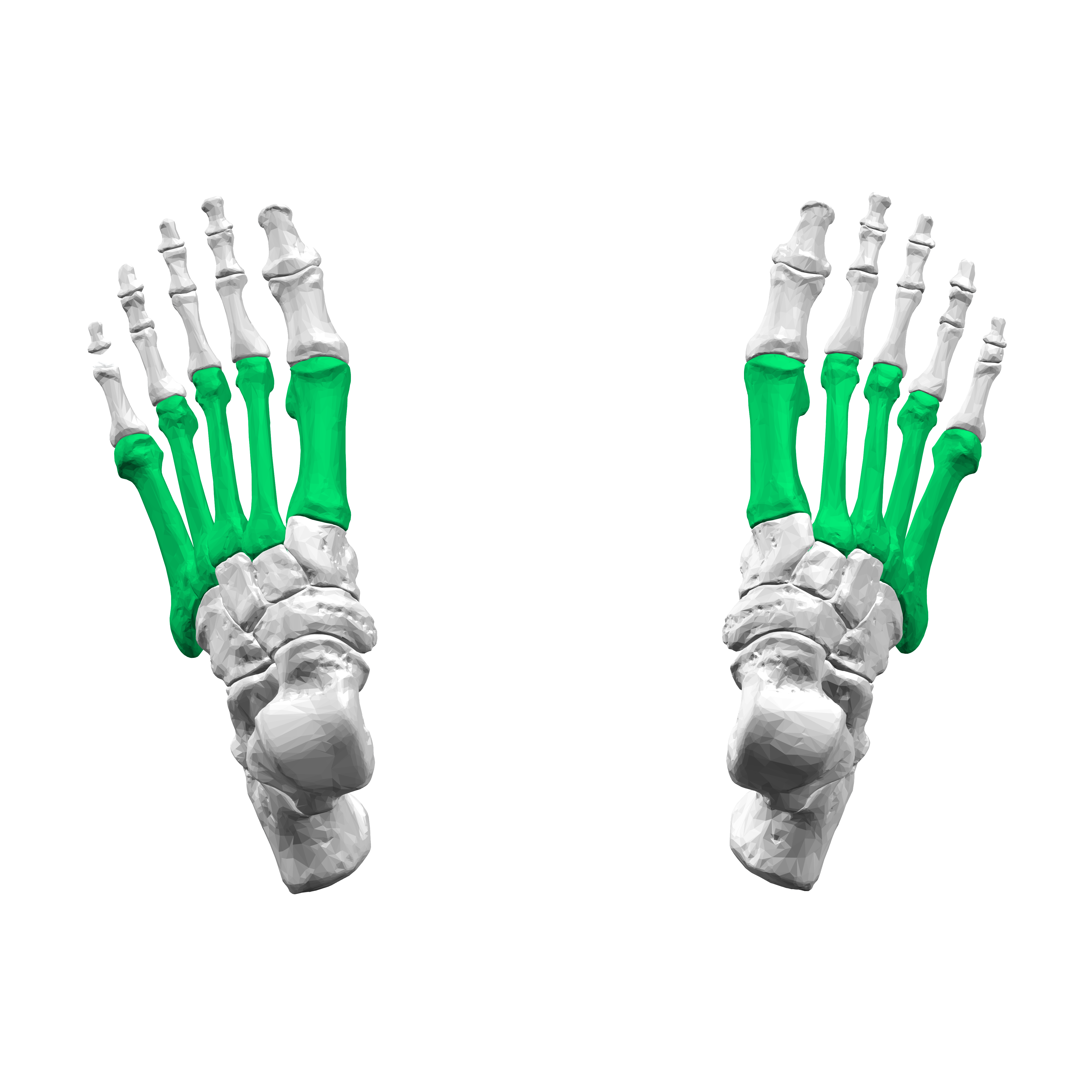
- Skeleton of foot. Superior view. Metatarsals shown in green.

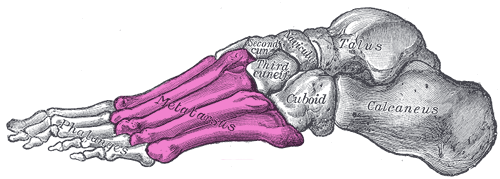
- Skeleton of left foot. Lateral aspect. Metatarsals shown in purple.

Details
- Articulations: Proximal phalanges, medial cuneiform, intermediate cuneiform, lateral cuneiform and the cuboid bone.

Identifiers
- Latin: metatarsus pl. ossa metatarsi (also: ossa metatarsalia)
- MeSH: D008682
- TA98: A02.5.17.001
- TA2: 1495
- FMA: 71340

The metatarsal bones, collectively the metatarsus (pl.: metatarsi), are a group of five long bones in the midfoot, located between the tarsal bones (which form the heel and the ankle) and the phalanges (toes). Lacking individual names, the metatarsal bones are numbered from the medial side (the side of the great toe): the first, second, third, fourth, and fifth metatarsal (often depicted with Roman numerals). The metatarsals are analogous to the metacarpal bones of the hand. The lengths of the metatarsal bones in humans are, in descending order, second, third, fourth, fifth, and first. A bovine hind leg has two metatarsals.

== Structure ==
The five metatarsals are dorsal convex long bones consisting of a shaft or body, a base (proximally), and a head (distally). The body is prismoid in form, tapers gradually from the tarsal to the phalangeal extremity, and is curved longitudinally, so as to be concave below, slightly convex above. The base or posterior extremity is wedge-shaped, articulating proximally with the tarsal bones, and by its sides with the contiguous metatarsal bones: its dorsal and plantar surfaces are rough for the attachment of ligaments. The head or distal extremity presents a convex articular surface, oblong from above downward, and extending farther backward below than above. Its sides are flattened, and on each is a depression, surmounted by a tubercle, for ligamentous attachment. Its plantar surface is grooved antero-posteriorly for the passage of the flexor tendons, and marked on either side by an articular eminence continuous with the terminal articular surface.

During growth, the growth plates are located distally on the metatarsals, except on the first metatarsal where it is located proximally. Yet it is quite common to have an accessory growth plate on the distal first metatarsal.

=== Articulations ===
Bones of the right foot. Dorsal surface. Metatarsus shown in yellow.

The base of each metatarsal bone articulates with one or more of the tarsal bones at the tarsometatarsal joints, and the head with one of the first row of phalanges at the metatarsophalangeal joints. Their bases also articulate with each other at the intermetatarsal joints

- The first metatarsal articulates with the medial cuneiform, and to a small extent to the intermediate cuneiform.
- the second with all three cuneiforms.
- the third with the lateral cuneiform.
- the fourth with the lateral cuneiform and the cuboid.
- The fifth with the cuboid.

=== Muscle attachments ===
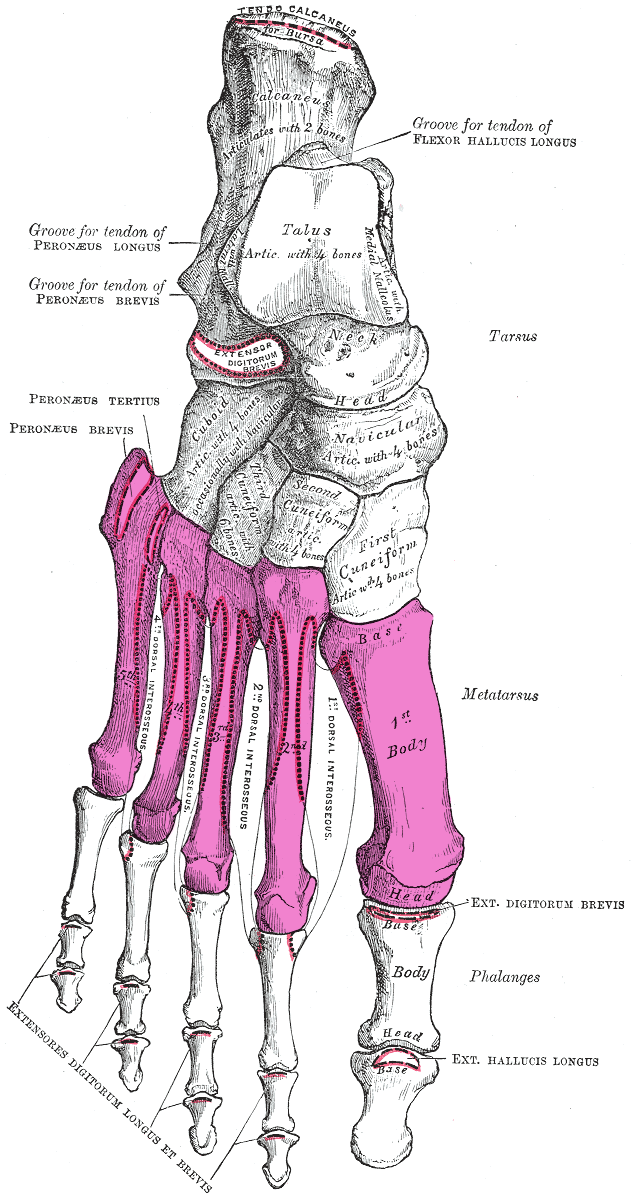
Muscle attachments (seen from above)

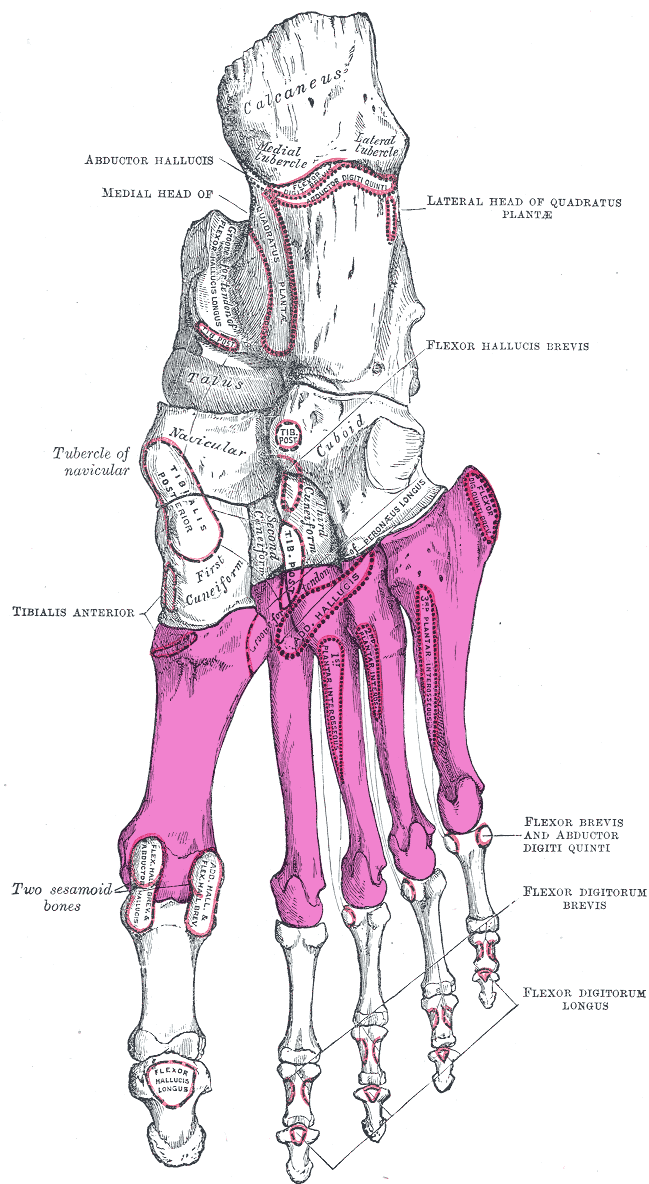
Muscle attachments (seen from below)

Muscle	Direction	Attachment
Tibialis anterior	Insertion	Basis of first metatarsal
Peroneous tertius	Insertion	Dorsal side basis of fifth metatarsal
Peroneous longus	Insertion	Tuberosity of first metatarsal
Peroneous brevis	Insertion	Tuberosity of fifth metatarsal
Horizontal head of adductor hallucis	Origin	Deep transverse metatarsal ligament
Flexor digiti minimi brevis	Origin	Basis of fifth metatarsal
Plantar interossei	Origin	Medial side of third, fourth and fifth metatarsal
Dorsal interossei	Origin	First to fifth metatarsal

== Clinical significance ==
=== Injuries ===
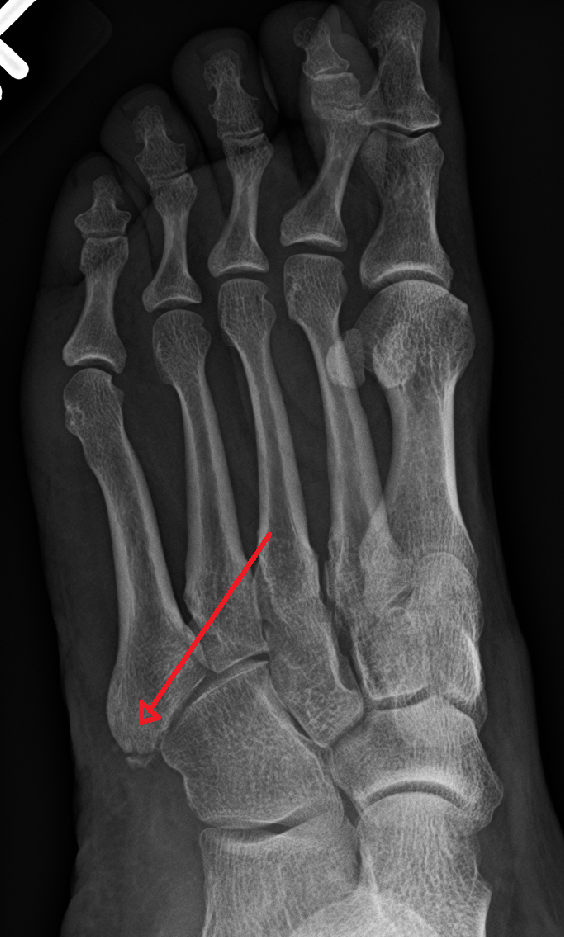
Fracture of the base of the 5th metatarsal

Stress fractures are thought to account for 16% of injuries related to sports participation, and the metatarsals are the bones most often involved. These fractures are sometimes called march fractures, based on their traditional association with military recruits after long marches. The second and third metatarsals are fixed while walking, thus these metatarsals are common sites of injury. The fifth metatarsal may be fractured if the foot is oversupinated during locomotion.

The metatarsal bones are often broken by association football (soccer) players. These and other recent cases have been attributed to the lightweight design of modern football boots, which provide less protection to the foot. In 2010 some football players began testing a new sock that incorporated a rubber silicone pad over the foot to provide protection to the top of the foot.

Protection from injuries can be given by the use of safety footwear which can use built-in or removable metatarsal guards.

== Additional images ==
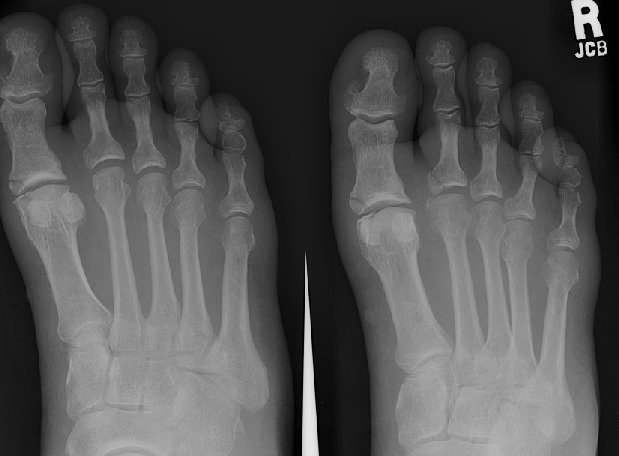
X-ray of foot

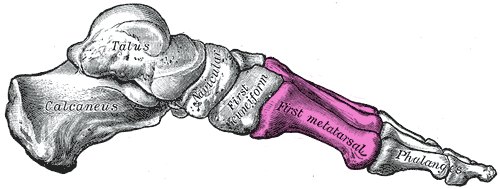
Skeleton of left foot, medial aspect

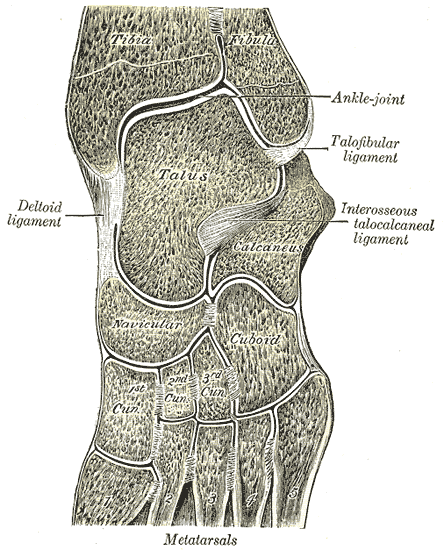
Oblique section of left intertarsal and tarsometatarsal articulations, showing the synovial cavities

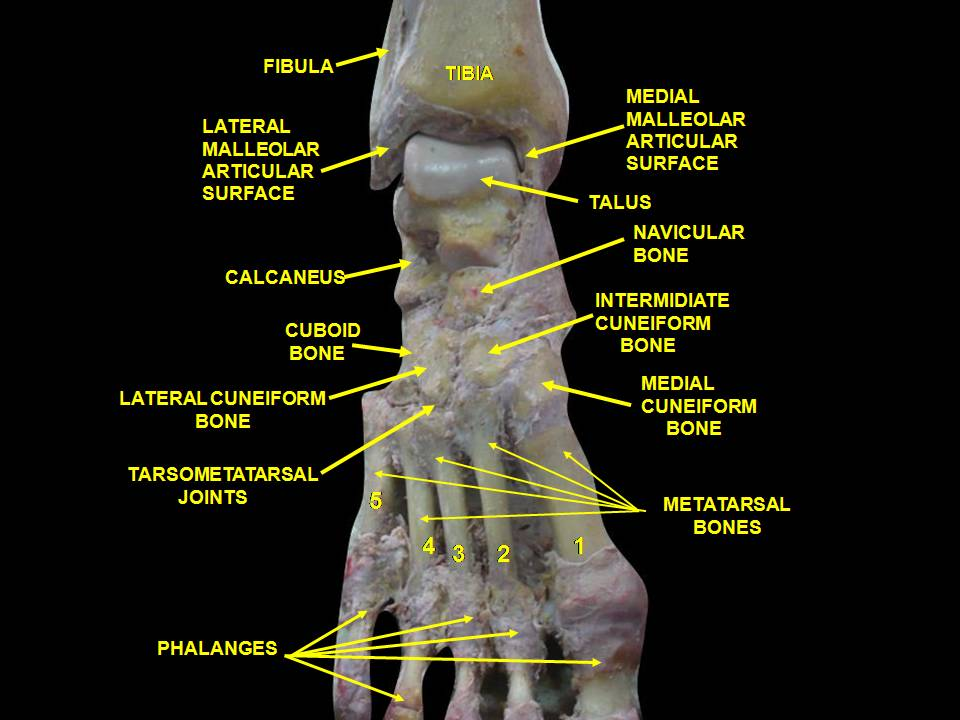
Ankle and tarsometarsal joints, showing bones of foot. Deep dissection.

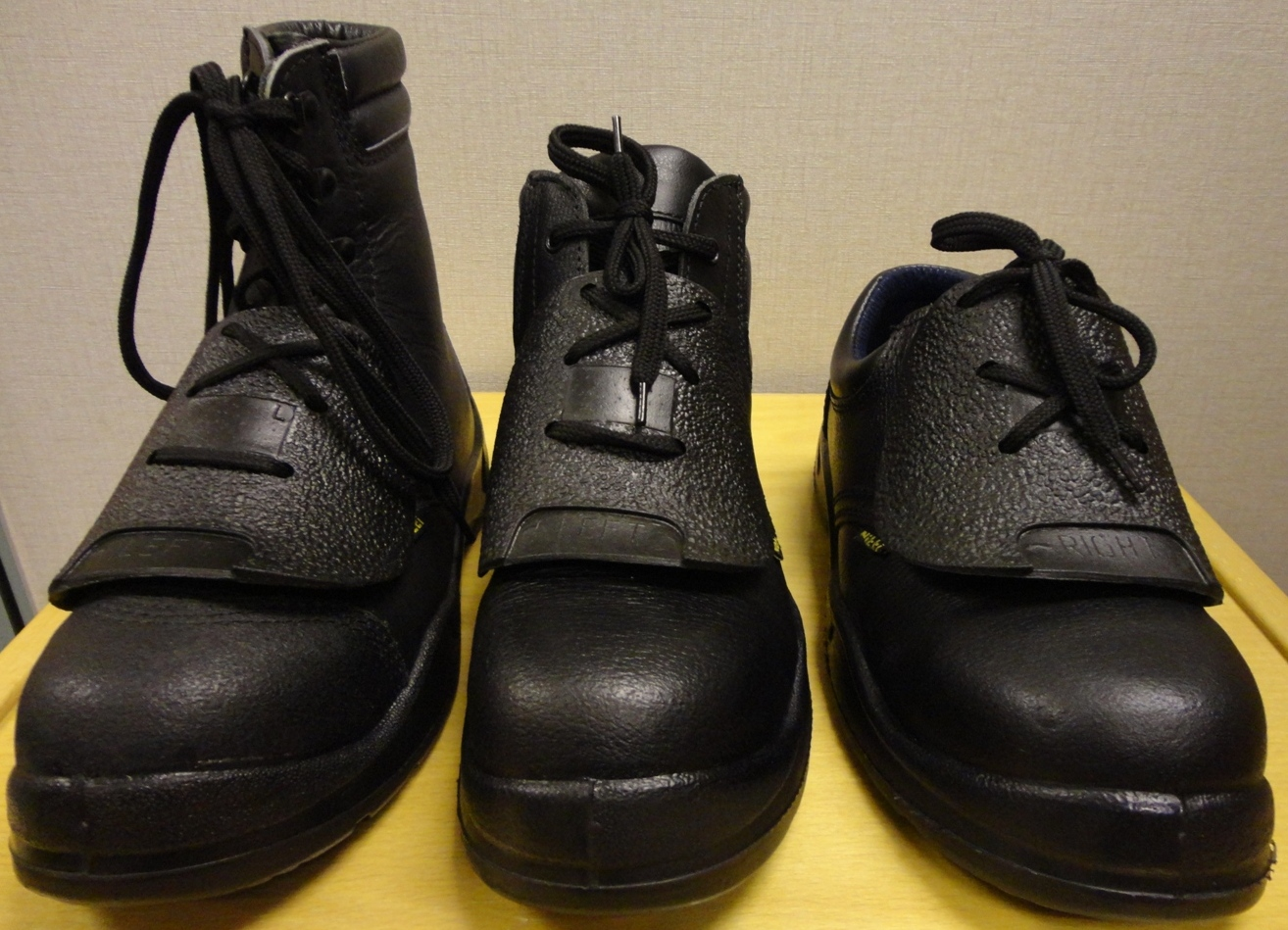
Safety footwear with removable metatarsal guard

== See also ==
- Arches of the foot
- Ball (foot)
- Bone terminology
- Terms for anatomical location
- Jones fracture
- Lisfranc injury
- Morton's toe
