= Transverse metatarsal ligament =

Ligament that connects the heads of the five metatarsal bones of the foot

Details

Identifiers
- Latin: ligamentum metatarsale transversum
- TA98: A03.6.10.804
- TA2: 1967
- FMA: 44490

The transverse metatarsal ligament is a narrow band which runs across and connects together the heads of all the metatarsal bones. It is blended anteriorly with the plantar (glenoid) ligaments of the metatarsophalangeal articulations.

Its plantar surface is concave where the Flexor tendons run below it. Above it, the tendons of the Interossei pass to their insertions.

Its homologue in the hand is the transverse metacarpal ligament, which connects the metacarpals to each other.

== Clinical significance ==
The dorsal digital nerves of the foot may be compressed by the transverse metatarsal ligament. This causes Morton's neuroma, which causes foot pain.

== See also ==
- Deep transverse metacarpal ligament
