= Plantar interossei muscles =

Three muscles located between the metatarsal bones in the foot

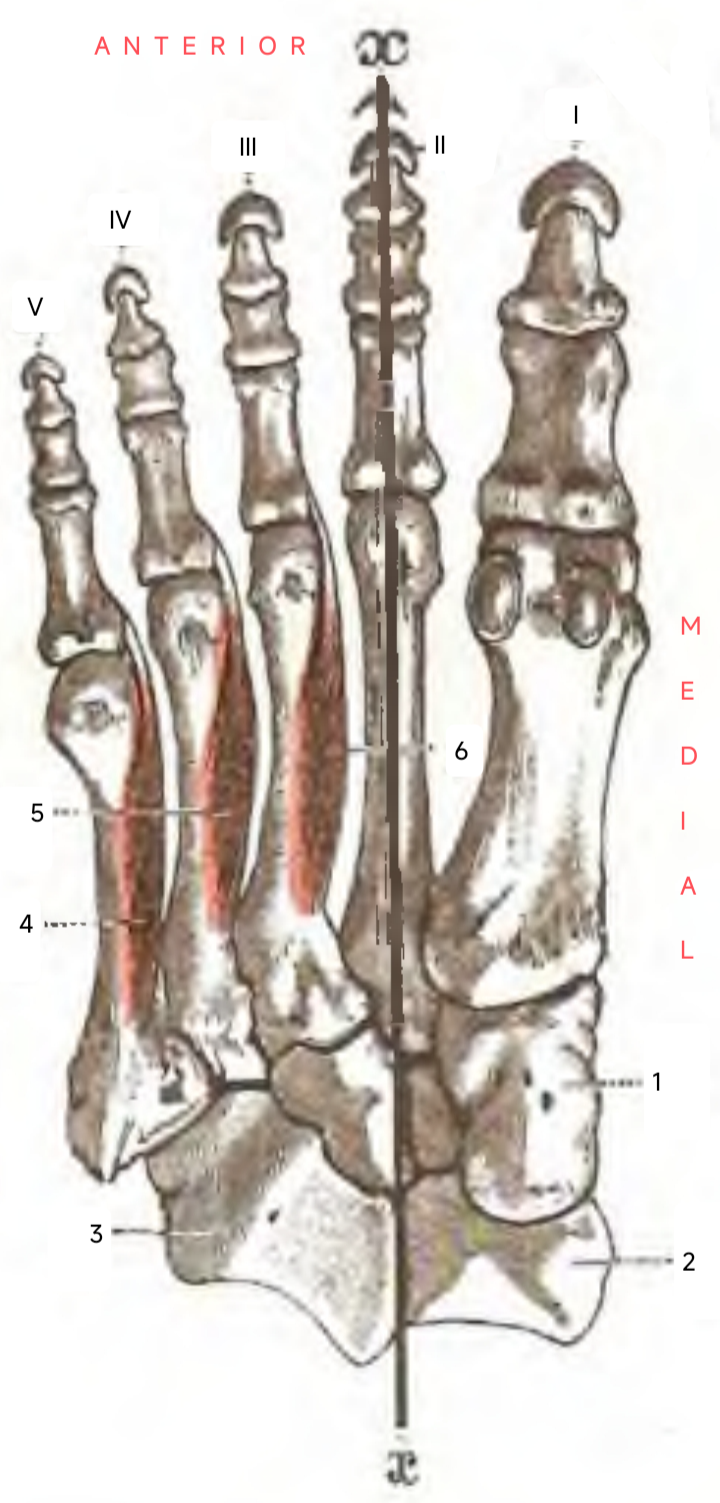
- The interossei plantares; right foot, inferior (plantar) view. (From Testut's Anatomy.)

Details
- Origin: Metatarsals, long plantar ligament
- Insertion: Medial side of proximal phalanges of 3rd to 5th toe
- Artery: Plantar artery, and dorsal metatarsal A
- Nerve: Lateral plantar nerve
- Actions: Adduct toes
- Antagonist: Dorsal interossei of the foot

Identifiers
- Latin: musculi interossei plantares
- TA98: A04.7.02.071
- TA2: 2687
- FMA: 37458

In human anatomy, plantar interossei muscles are three muscles located between the metatarsal bones in the foot.

== Structure ==
The three plantar interosseous muscles are unipennate, as opposed to the bipennate structure of dorsal interosseous muscles, and originate on a single metatarsal bone. The three muscles originate on the medial aspect of metatarsals III-V. The muscles cross the metatarsophalangeal joint of toes III-V so the insertions correspond with the origin and there is no crossing between toes.

The muscles then continue distally along the foot and insert in the proximal phalanges III-V. The muscles cross the metatarsophalangeal joint of toes III-V so the insertions correspond with the origin and there is no crossing between toes.

=== Innervation ===
All three plantar interosseous muscles are innervated by the lateral plantar nerve. The lateral plantar nerve is a branch from the tibial nerve, which originally branches off the sciatic nerve from the sacral plexus.

== Function ==
Since the intersseous muscles cross on the metatarsophalangeal joint, then they act on that specific joint and cause adduction of toes III, IV, and V.

Adduction itself is not of extreme importance to the toes, but these muscles work together with the dorsal interosseous muscles in flexion of the foot. They also work together to strengthen the metatarsal arch.

== Additional images ==
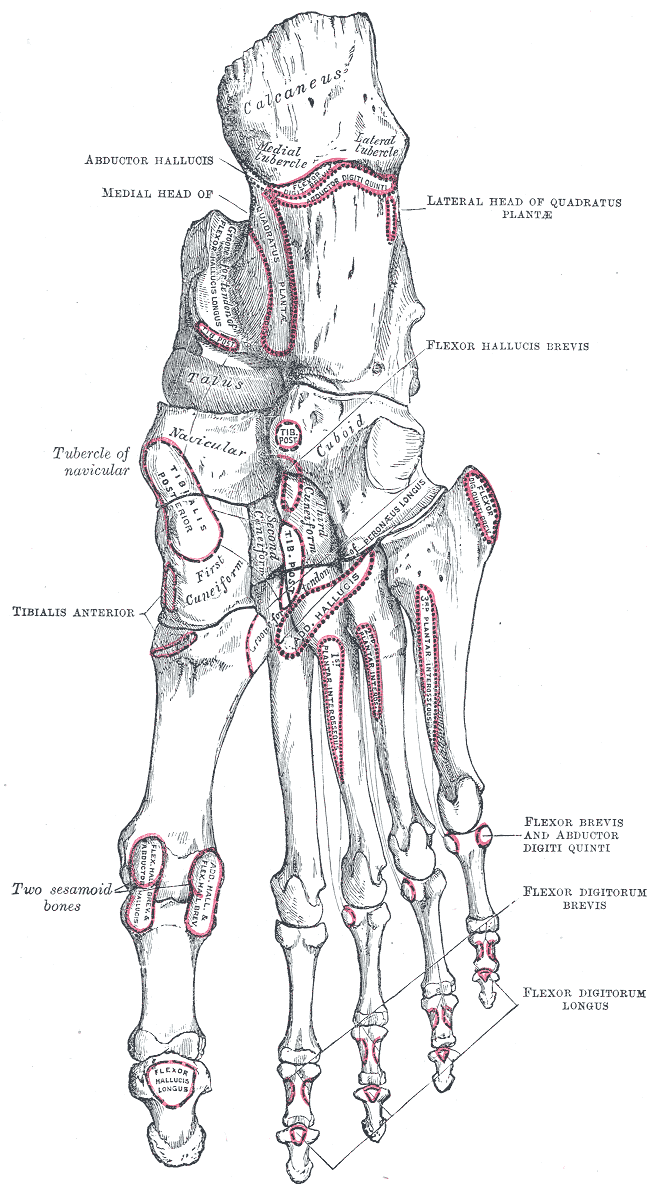
Bones of the right foot. Plantar surface.

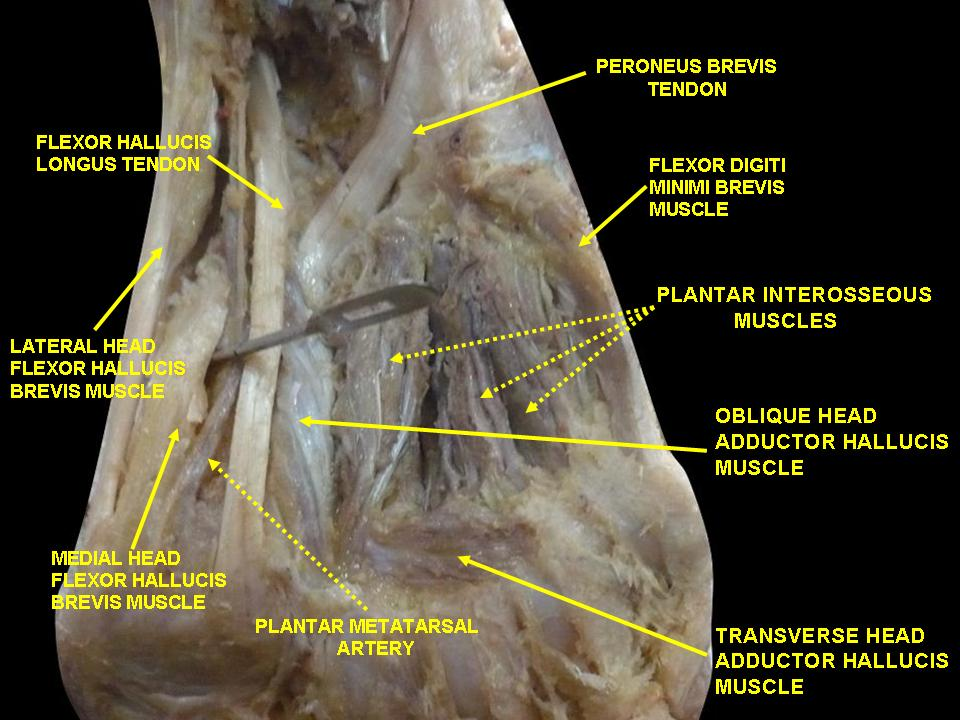
Muscles of the sole of the foot.

== See also ==
- Interosseous muscles of the hand
  - Dorsal interossei of the hand
  - Palmar interossei
- Interosseous muscles of the foot
  - Dorsal interossei of the foot
