= Dorsal interossei of the foot =

Four muscles situated between the metatarsal bones

Dorsal interossei muscles
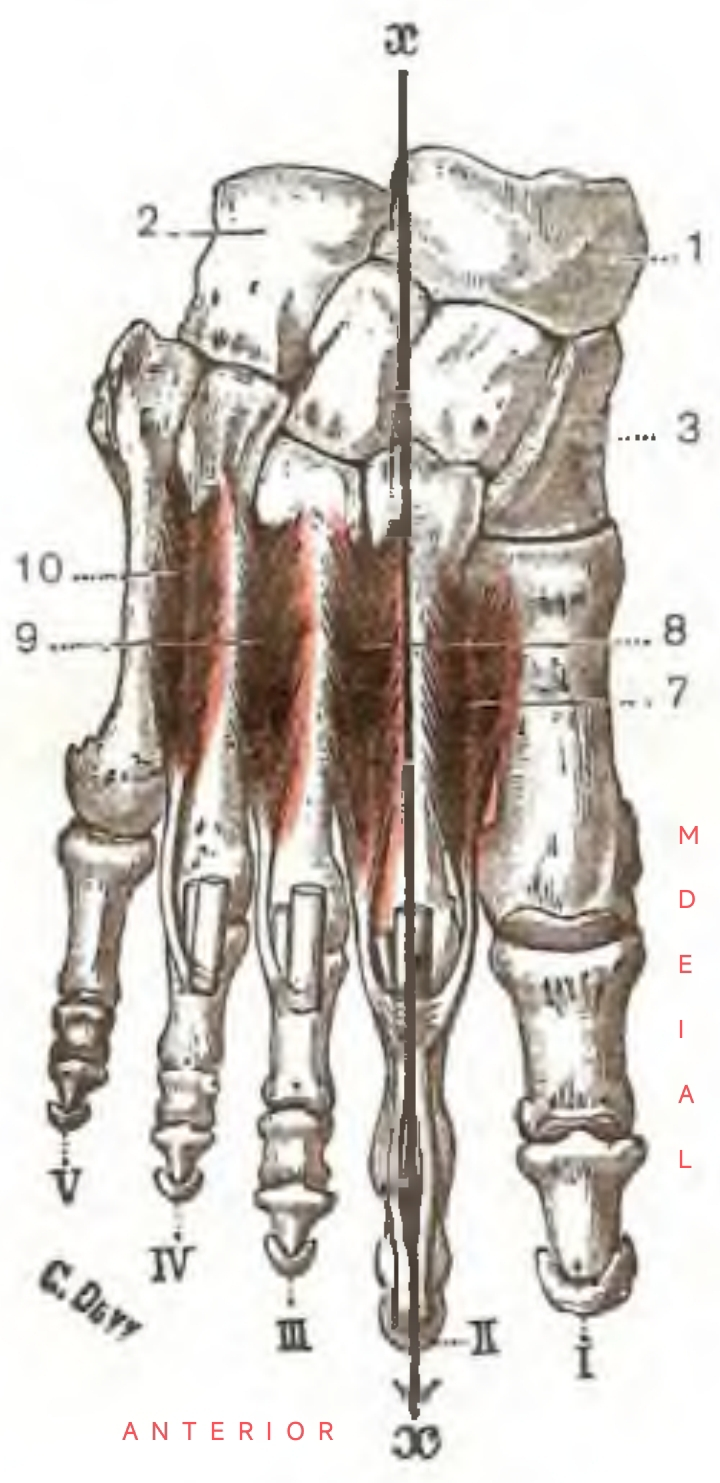
- The interossei dorsales; right foot, superior (dorsal) view. (From Testut's Anatomy.).

Details
- Origin: Metatarsals
- Insertion: Proximal phalanges
- Nerve: Lateral plantar nerve
- Actions: Abduct toes
- Antagonist: Plantar interossei muscles

Identifiers
- Latin: musculi interossei dorsales pedis
- TA98: A04.7.02.070
- TA2: 2686
- FMA: 37457

In human anatomy, the dorsal interossei of the foot are four muscles situated between the metatarsal bones.

== Origin ==
The four interossei muscles are bipenniform muscles each originating by two heads from the proximal half of the sides of adjacent metatarsal bones.

== Insertion ==
The two heads of each muscle form a central tendon which passes forwards deep to the deep transverse metatarsal ligament. The tendons are inserted on the bases of the second, third, and fourth proximal phalanges and into the aponeurosis of the tendons of the extensor digitorum longus without attaching to the extensor hoods of the toes.

Thus, the first is inserted into the medial side of the second toe; the other three are inserted into the lateral sides of the second, third, and fourth toes.

== Action ==
The dorsal interossei abduct at the metatarsophalangeal joints of the third and fourth toes. Because there is a pair of dorsal interossei muscles attached on both sides of the second toe, simultaneous contraction of these muscles results in no movement. This arrangement of dorsal interossei makes the second toe the midline of the foot, whereas the midline of the hand (marked by dorsal interossei of hand) is in the third finger.

Abduction is of little importance in the foot, but, together with the plantar interossei, the dorsal interossei also produce flexion at the metatarsophalangeal joints. Although small, the dorsal interossei are powerful muscles that, together with their plantar counterparts, control the direction of the toes during violent activity, thus allowing the long and short flexors to perform their actions.

Because of the relationship to the metatarsophalangeal joints, the interossei muscles also contribute to maintaining the anterior metatarsal arch of the foot and also, to a limited extent, the medial and lateral longitudinal arches of the foot.

== Innervation ==
All dorsal interossei are innervated by the lateral plantar nerve (S2–3). Those in the fourth interosseous space are innervated by the superficial branch and the other by the deep branch. The first and second dorsal interossei muscles additionally receive innervation from the lateral branch of the deep fibular nerve.

== Relations ==
In the angular interval left between the heads of each of the three lateral muscles, one of the perforating arteries passes to the dorsum of the foot; through the space between the heads of the first muscle the deep plantar branch of the dorsalis pedis artery enters the sole of the foot.

== See also ==
- Interosseous muscles of the hand
  - Dorsal interossei of the hand
  - Palmar interossei muscles
- Interosseous muscles of the foot
  - Plantar interossei muscles

== Additional images ==
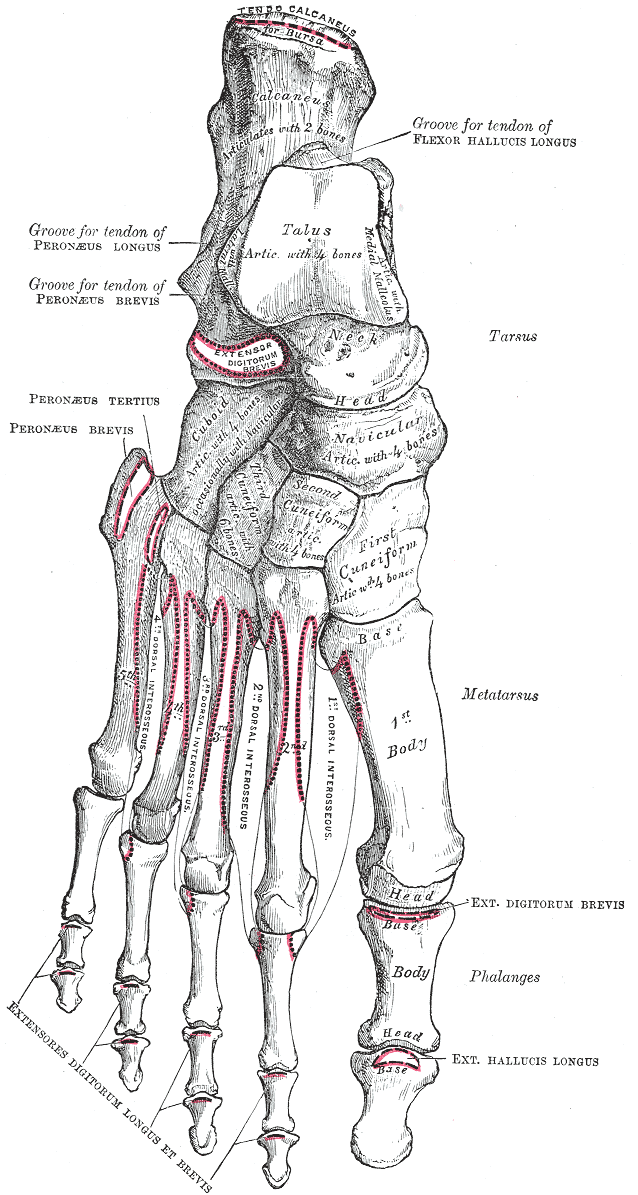
Bones of the right foot. Dorsal surface.
