= Cuneiform bones =

Three bones in the human foot

Cuneiform bones; Cuneiform
- Red=medial; yellow=intermediate; green=lateral

Details

Identifiers
- Latin: os cuneiformis pl. ossa cuneiformia
- FMA: 24517

There are three cuneiform ("wedge-shaped") bones in the human foot:

- the first or medial cuneiform
- the second or intermediate cuneiform, also known as the middle cuneiform
- the third or lateral cuneiform

They are located between the navicular bone and the first, second and third metatarsal bones and are medial to the cuboid bone.

== Structure ==
There are three cuneiform bones:

1. The medial cuneiform (also known as first cuneiform) is the largest of the cuneiforms. It is situated at the medial side of the foot, anterior to the navicular bone and posterior to the base of the first metatarsal. Lateral to it is the intermediate cuneiform. It articulates with four bones: the navicular, second cuneiform, and first and second metatarsals. The tibialis anterior and fibularis longus muscle inserts at the medial cuneiform bone.
2. The intermediate cuneiform (second cuneiform or middle cuneiform) is shaped like a wedge, the thin end pointing downwards. The intermediate cuneiform is situated between the other two cuneiform bones (the medial and lateral cuneiforms), and articulates with the navicular posteriorly, the second metatarsal anteriorly and with the other cuneiforms on either side.
3. The lateral cuneiform (also known as third cuneiform or external cuneiform) intermediate in size between the other two cuneiform bones, is also wedge-shaped, the base being uppermost. It occupies the center of the front row of the tarsal bones, between the intermediate cuneiform medially, the cuboid laterally, the navicular posteriorly and the third metatarsal in front. The tibialis posterior inserts at the lateral cuneiform, while the flexor hallucis brevis originates from it.

=== Muscle attachments ===
Muscle	Direction	Attachment
Tibialis anterior	Insertion	Medial cuneiform
Fibularis longus	Insertion	Medial cuneiform
Tibialis posterior	Insertion	Medial cuneiform
Flexor hallucis brevis	Origin	Lateral cuneiform

== Injuries ==
- Lisfranc fracture – in which one or all of the metatarsals are displaced from the tarsus
- Cuneiform fracture - Due to the ligamentous support of the midfoot, isolated cuneiform fractures are rare

== Additional images ==
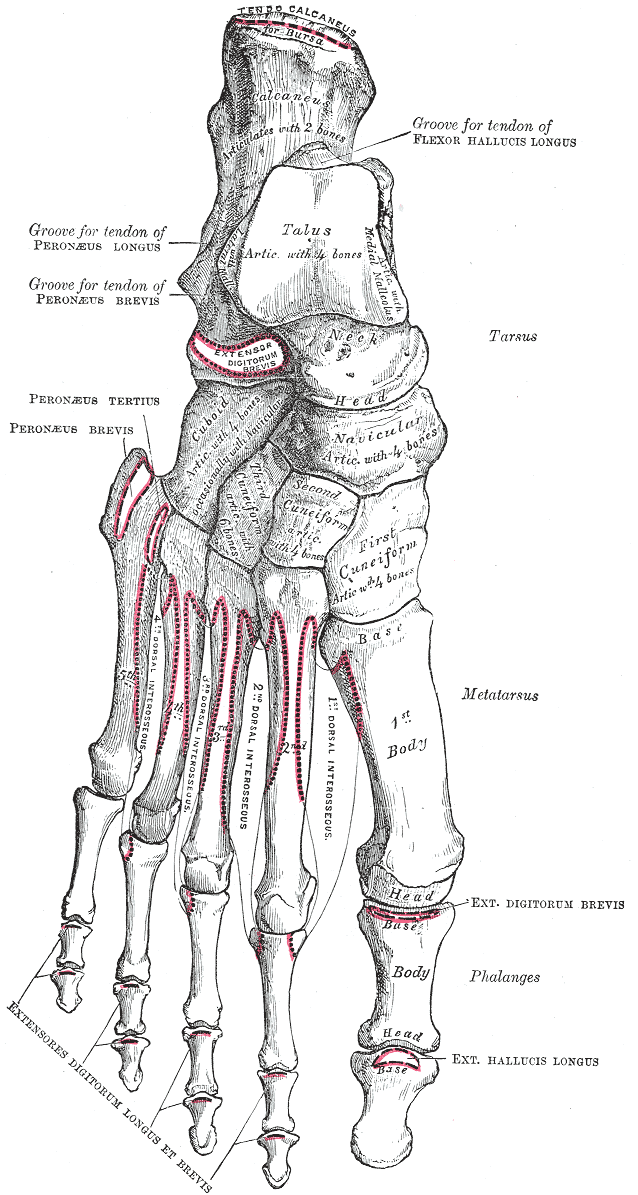
Bones of the right foot. Dorsal surface.

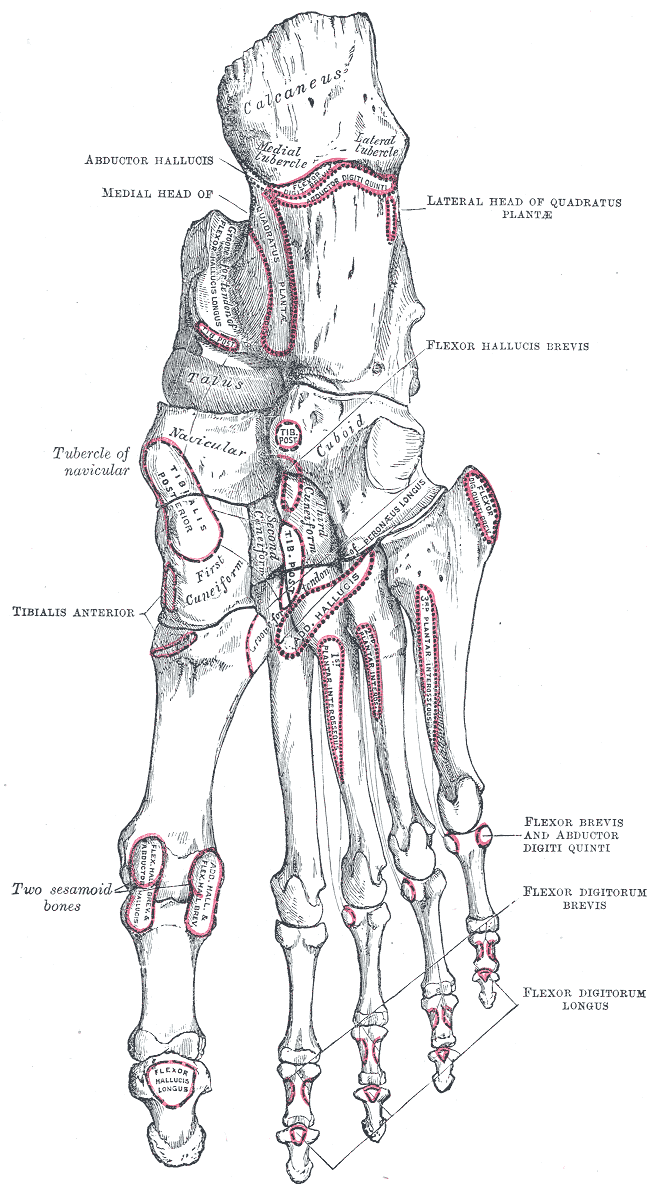
Bones of the right foot. Plantar Surface.

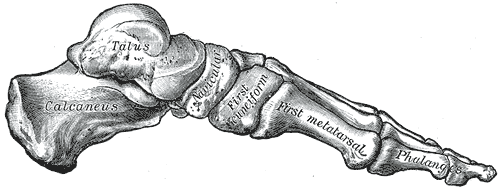
Skeleton of foot. Medial aspect.

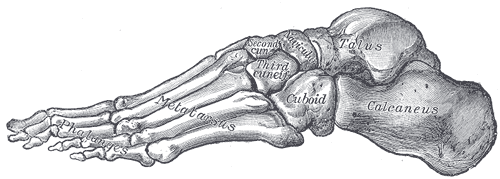
Skeleton of foot. Lateral aspect.

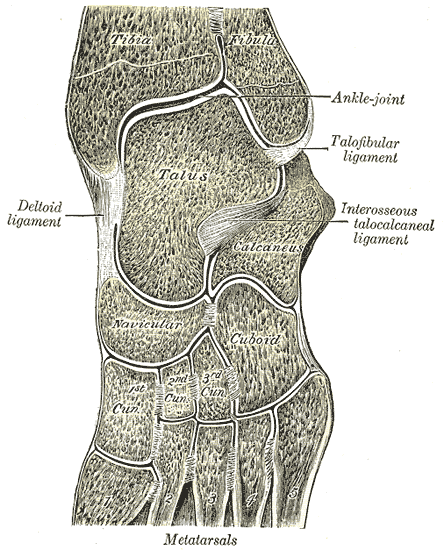
Oblique section of left intertarsal and tarsometatarsal articulations, showing the synovial cavities.

Bones of foot

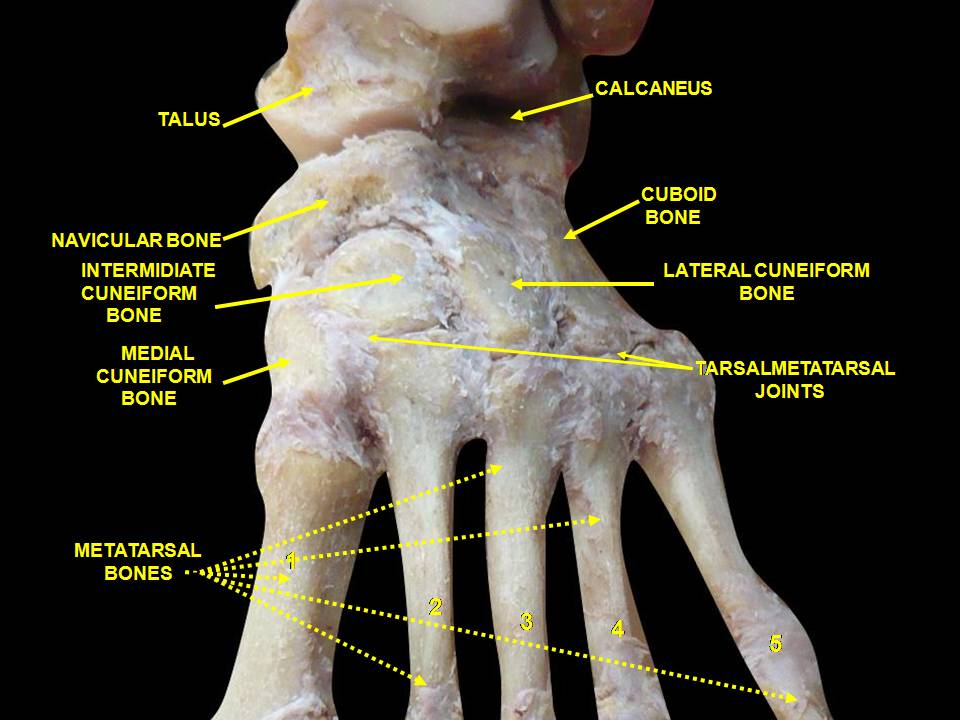
Cuneiform. Superior view.

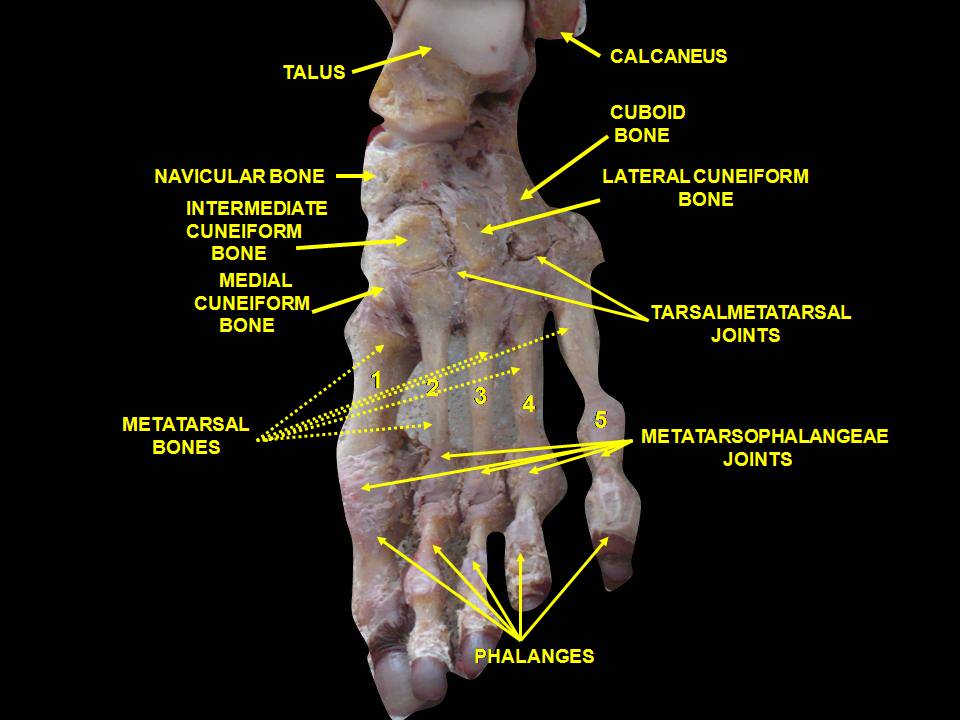
Cuneiform. Superior view.

== See also ==
- Cuneiform, for writing by pressing a wedge-shaped reed into wet clay.
