= Deep transverse metacarpal ligament =

Ligament in the fingers of the hand

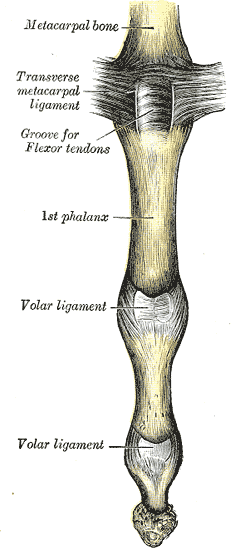
- Metacarpophalangeal articulation and articulations of digit. Volar aspect.

Details
- From: Head of metacarpal
- To: Head of adjacent metacarpal

Identifiers
- Latin: ligamentum metacarpeum transversum profundum
- TA98: A03.5.11.504
- TA2: 1838
- FMA: 42459

The deep transverse metacarpal ligament (also called the deep transverse palmar ligament) connects the palmar surfaces of metacarpophalangeal joints of all the fingers of the hand except the thumb.

== Structure ==
The deep transverse metacarpal ligament is a narrow fibrous band. It blends with the palmar metacarpophalangeal ligaments.

Its palmar surface is concave where the flexor tendons pass over it. Behind it, the tendons of the interosseous muscles of the hand pass to their insertions.

== Clinical significance ==
Rarely, the deep transverse metacarpal ligament may rupture.

== Additional images ==
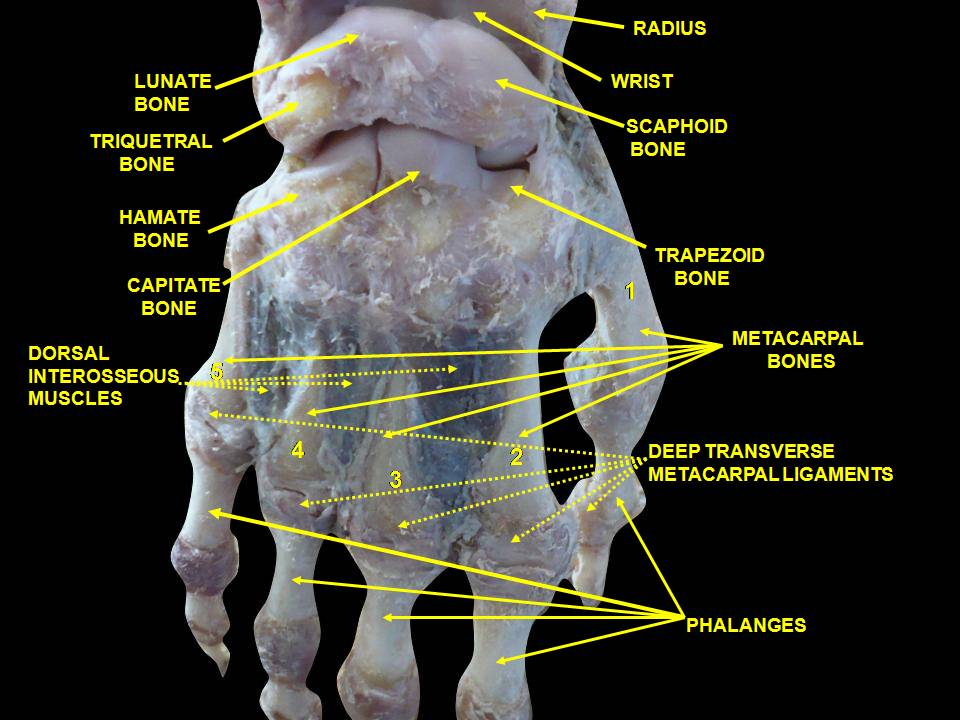
Wrist joint. Deep dissection. Posterior view.

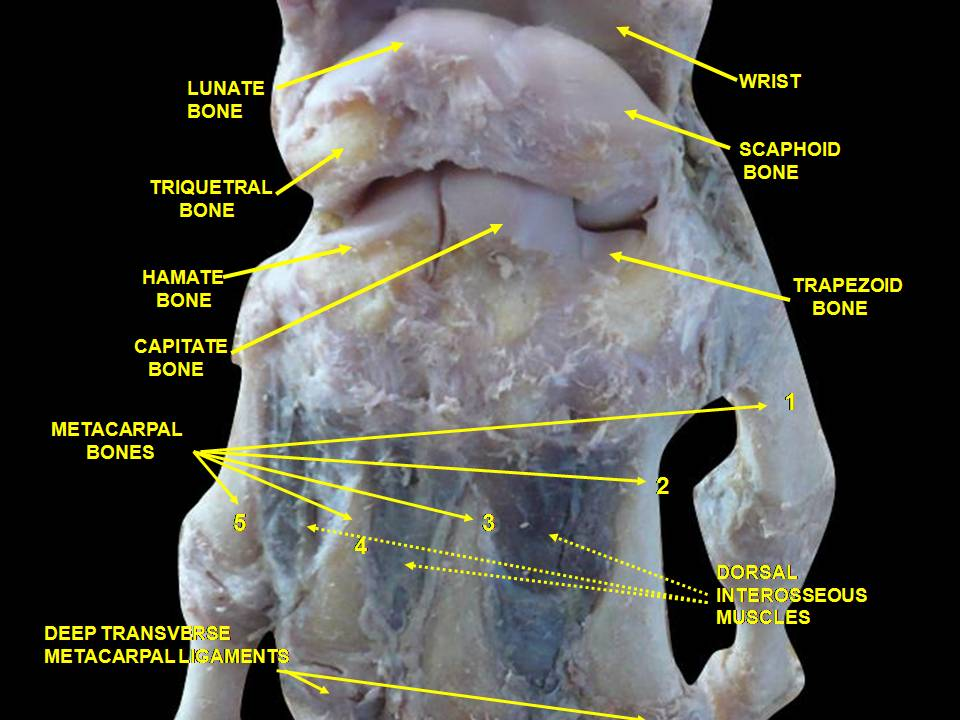
Wrist joint. Deep dissection. Posterior view.

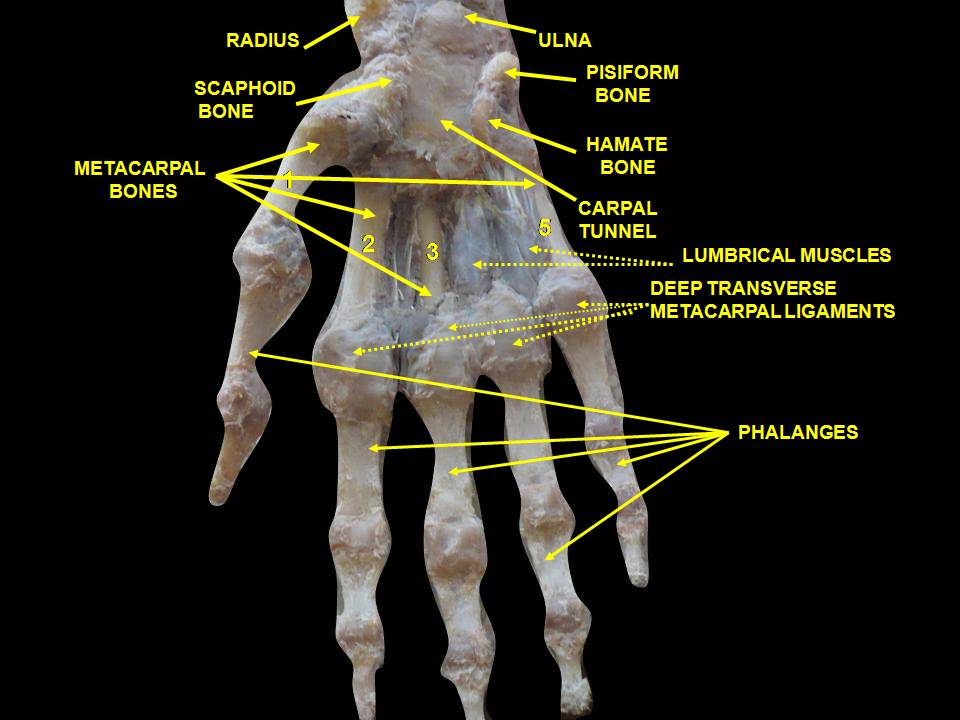
Wrist joint. Deep dissection. Anterior, palmar, view.

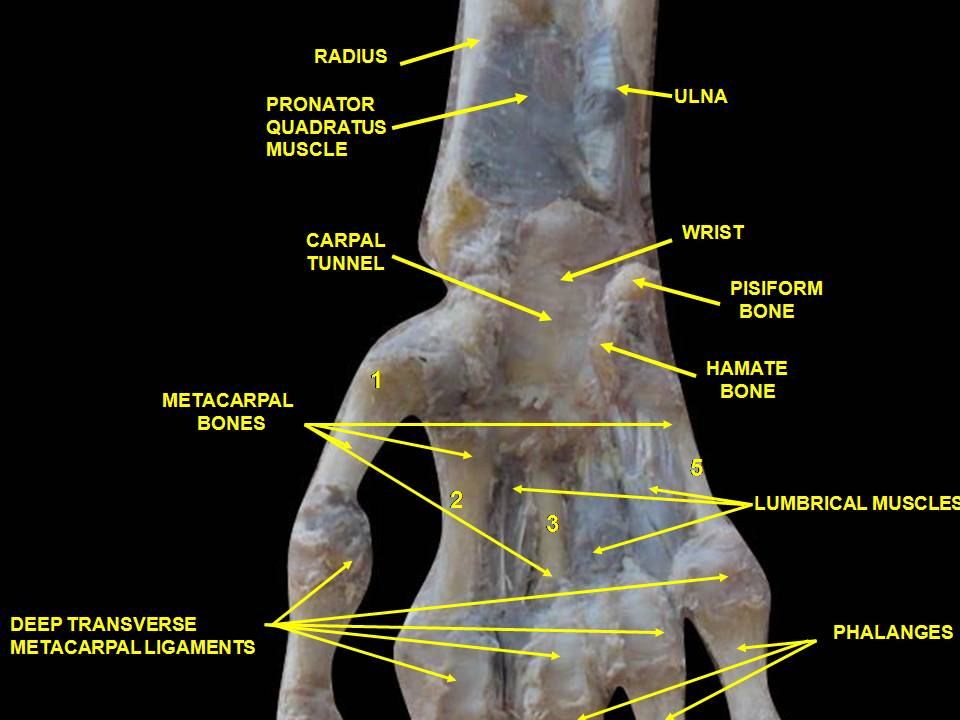
Wrist joint. Deep dissection. Anterior, palmar, view.

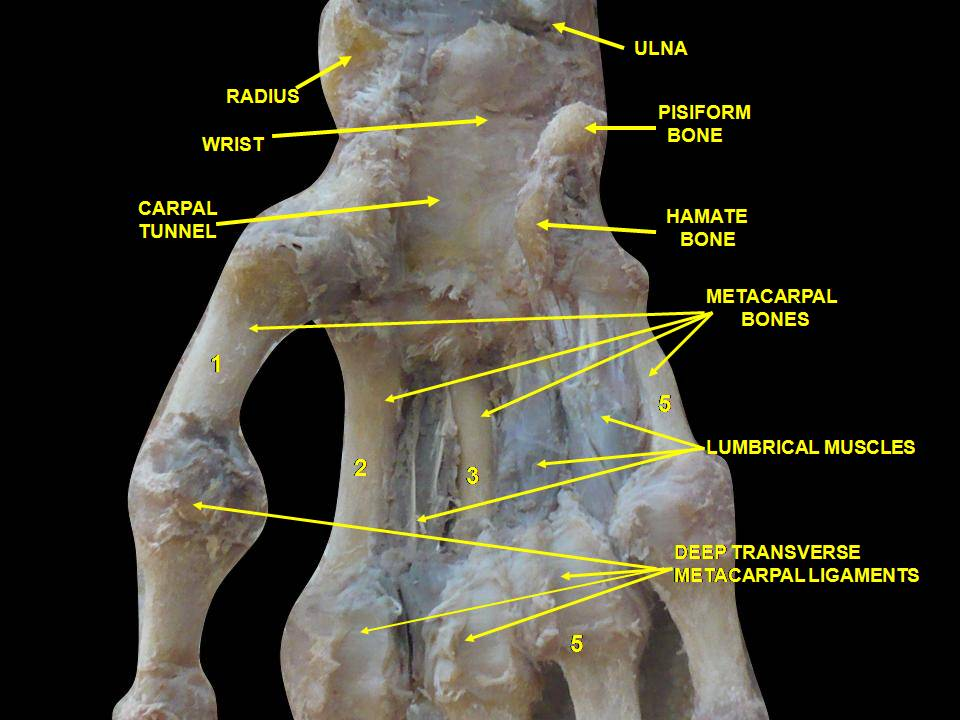
Wrist joint. Deep dissection. Anterior, palmar, view.

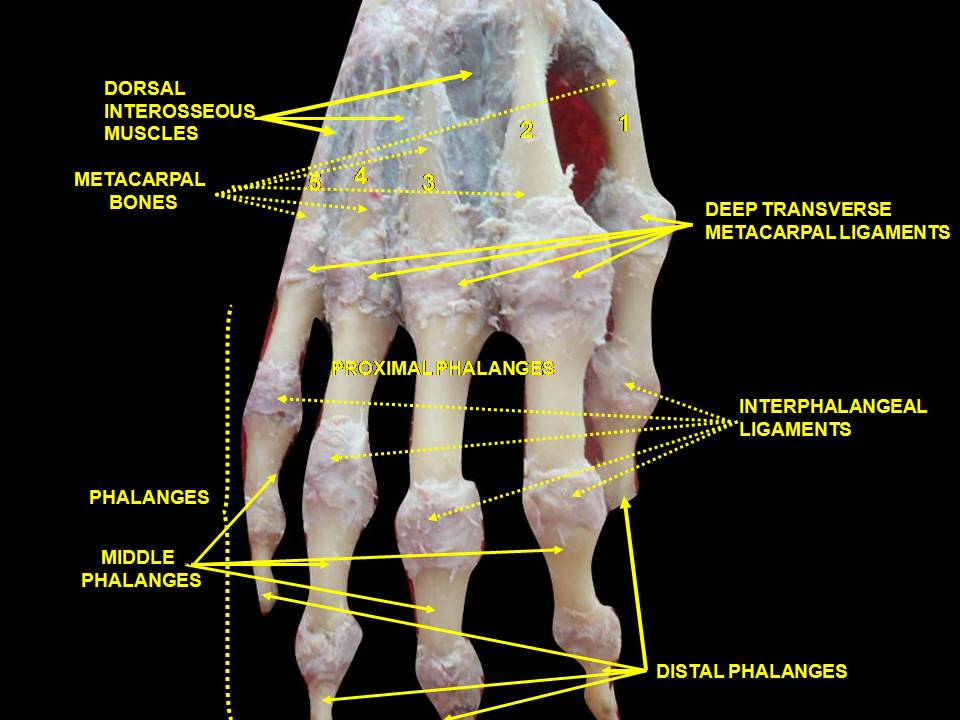
Interphalangeal ligaments and phalanges. Right hand. Deep dissection. Posterior (dorsal) view.
