= Interosseous muscles of the hand =

Muscles of the hand

Details
- Origin: Dorsal: metacarpal bones 1 to 5. Palmar: metacarpal bones of digits 2, 4, 5
- Insertion: Dorsal: bases of proximal phalanges and extensor expansions of digits 2 to 4. Palmar: base of proximal phalanx and extensor expansion of the same digit from which it originated.
- Nerve: deep branch of the ulnar nerve
- Actions: Dorsal: Abduct digits. Palmar: Adduct digits.

The interosseous muscles of the hand are muscles found near the metacarpal bones that help to control the fingers. They are considered voluntary muscles.

They are generally divided into two sets:

- 4 Dorsal interossei - Abduct the digits away from the 3rd digit (away from axial line) and are bipennate.
- 3 Palmar interossei - Adduct the digits towards the 3rd digit (towards the axial line) and are unipennate.

This is often remembered by the mnemonic PAD-DAB, as the Palmar interosseous muscles ADduct, and the Dorsal interosseous muscles ABduct. The axial line goes down the middle of the 3rd digit, towards the palm of the hand (it's an imaginary line).

Both sets of muscles are innervated by the deep branch of the ulnar nerve.
