= Lisfranc =

Lisfranc may refer to:

- Jacques Lisfranc de St. Martin (1787–1847), French surgeon and gynecologist
- Lisfranc injury
- Lisfranc joint
- Lisfranc ligament
