= Derek Carr =

American football player (born 1991)

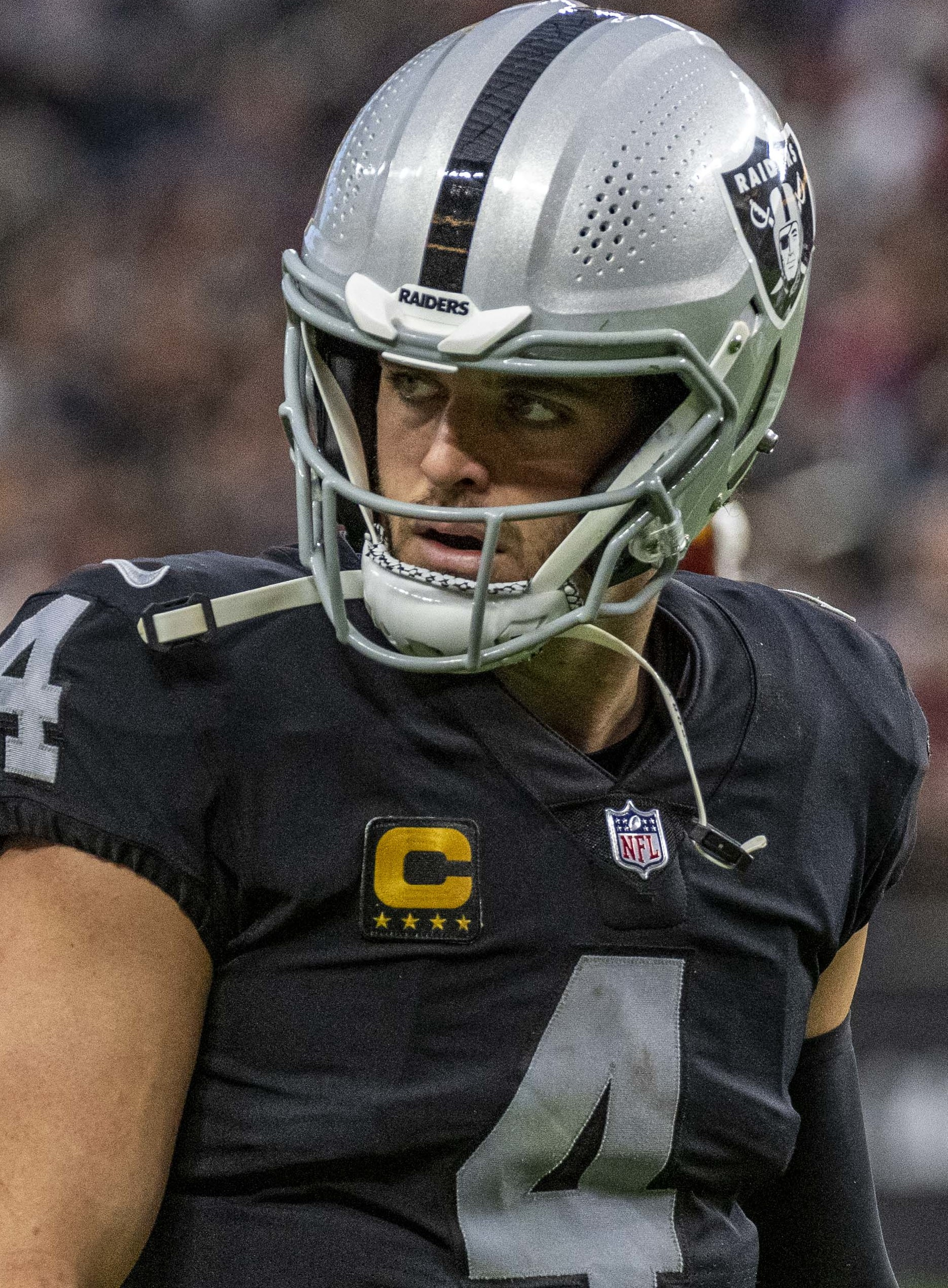
- Carr with the Las Vegas Raiders in 2021

UCLA Bruins
- Title: Special advisor

Personal information
- Born: March 28, 1991 (age 35); Fresno, California, U.S.
- Listed height: 6 ft 3 in (1.91 m)
- Listed weight: 215 lb (98 kg)

Career information
- Position: Quarterback (No. 4)
- High school: Bakersfield Christian (Bakersfield, California)
- College: Fresno State (2009–2013)
- NFL draft: 2014: 2nd round, 36th overall pick

Career history

Playing
- Oakland / Las Vegas Raiders (2014–2022); New Orleans Saints (2023–2024)

Coaching
- UCLA (2026–present) Special advisor

Awards and highlights
- 4× Pro Bowl (2015–2017, 2022); Sammy Baugh Trophy (2013); NCAA passing yards leader (2013); NCAA passing touchdowns leader (2013); MW Male Athlete of the Year (2013); 2× MW Offensive Player of the Year (2012, 2013); 2× First-team All-MW (2012, 2013); First-team All-WAC (2011); Fresno State Bulldogs No. 4 retired

Career NFL statistics
- Passing attempts: 5,785
- Passing completions: 3,765
- Completion percentage: 65.1%
- TD–INT: 257–112
- Passing yards: 41,245
- Passer rating: 92.8
- Stats at Pro Football Reference

Derek Dallas Carr (born March 28, 1991) is an American former professional football quarterback who played 11 seasons in the National Football League (NFL). He played college football for the Fresno State Bulldogs, receiving first-team All-Mountain West Conference honors twice before being selected by the Oakland Raiders in the second round of the 2014 NFL draft.

A four-time Pro Bowler, Carr helped the Raiders reach the playoffs during the 2016 season, the franchise's first appearance since 2002, as well as another postseason berth in 2021. Following a 2022 season that was below expectations, Carr lost his starting job and agreed with Raiders leadership to be released following the conclusion of the season. He left the Raiders as the franchise leader in passing yards, passing touchdowns, and pass completions. After leaving the Raiders, Carr played two seasons for the New Orleans Saints before announcing his retirement in 2025 due to a severe rotator cuff injury.

== Early life ==
Carr was born in Fresno, California, the youngest of three children to Rodger and Sheryl Carr. He and his family lived in Bakersfield before relocating to Sugar Land, Texas, in 2002 when his oldest brother, David Carr, became the first overall draft pick of the then-expansion Houston Texans. Carr and his family moved back to Bakersfield for his senior year, and he attended Bakersfield Christian High School.

Carr's high school football career began at Clements High School in Sugar Land, Texas. After playing on the freshman team his first year, he became a backup quarterback on the varsity team as a sophomore. He did not prepare himself to become the starting quarterback, but a preseason injury to another quarterback thrust him into the role.

Carr made gradual progress as a starter for the Clements High School Rangers. He passed for 1,246 yards and 12 touchdowns as a sophomore, and 1,622 yards and 16 touchdowns as a junior. While a junior, Carr led his team to an undefeated 13–0 season (playoffs included) before losing in the quarterfinals of the 2007 Class 5A Division 2 State playoffs in Region 3 to a Bo Levi Mitchell-led (and also undefeated) Katy High School Tigers, the eventual champions. Also during his junior year, Carr was heavily recruited. His college choices included Fresno State, SMU, Boise State, the University of Southern California, UCLA, and Utah. Of these schools, only Fresno State, SMU, and Utah made a scholarship offer to Carr. Ultimately, he verbally committed to Fresno State on May 25, 2008, at the end of his junior year. Carr was the program's first recruit of the 2009 class.

In 2008, Bakersfield Christian High School athletic director and former NFL player Doug Barnett confirmed that Carr would transfer to BCHS, amid rumors that he would have gone to nearby Stockdale High School or Bakersfield High School, two schools with historically good football programs.

As a senior, Carr led the Eagles football team to a 12–1 record and the California Interscholastic Federation Central Section Division V championship; the only blemish came at home against Oaks Christian High School, a national football powerhouse, during the team's season opener. On October 29, 2008, Carr was selected by ESPN RISE as the National Football Player of the Week after passing for 441 yards and three touchdowns in a game against Tehachapi High School five days earlier. Carr would eventually set a Central Section record by throwing 544 yards in a win against Arvin High School on November 7, 2008. Carr was also selected by The Bakersfield Californian as the 2008 All-Area Football Player of the Year. Carr also set a new school record when he passed for six touchdowns and ran for two in a blowout win against small school Fowler High at home. After his high school football career finished, Carr was named the National Player of the Year by the National Private Schools Athletic Association in 2009.

== College career ==
=== 2009 and 2010 seasons ===
Carr enrolled as an early-entry freshman for the spring semester at Fresno State, where his brother David also played quarterback, in 2009 so he could participate in spring football with the Bulldogs. Fresno State head coach Pat Hill stated that Carr, a true freshman, was "in the mix" for the starting quarterback position as late as mid-July. However, days before the 2009 season began in September, Hill announced junior Ryan Colburn would start over Carr. Carr appeared in five games as a freshman in limited action.

Colburn continued to be the Bulldogs' starter going into 2010. After redshirting his 2010 season, Carr took over the starting quarterback position for Fresno State in the fall of 2011.

=== 2011 season ===
Carr earned his opportunity to start for the Bulldogs in their 4–9 season in 2011. He made his first appearance as starter in the Bulldogs' season-opening loss to California. Three weeks later, Carr had a breakout game in a victory over Idaho with 371 passing yards, five touchdowns, and two interceptions. Six games later, on November 12 in a loss to New Mexico State, he had a season-high 391 passing yards and three touchdowns. In the 2011 season, Carr passed for 3,544 passing yards, 26 touchdowns, and nine interceptions. He was among the passing leaders of the Western Athletic Conference in numerous categories.

=== 2012 season ===
Going into the season, Carr had a new head coach in Tim DeRuyter, who replaced the fired Pat Hill. Carr helped lead the Bulldogs to a significant improvement, going 9–4 in 2012. Going into the season, Davante Adams was coming off a redshirt and instantly became a reliable target for Carr.

After splitting the first two games of the season, Carr passed for 300 yards, five touchdowns, and one interception in a victory over Colorado on September 15. Two weeks later, Carr had a career game in a 52–40 victory over San Diego State. He passed for a school-record tying 536 yards, five touchdowns, and two interceptions. On October 27, in a game on the road against New Mexico, he had 416 yards, four touchdowns, and one interception in the 49–32 victory. In the Bulldogs' regular season finale against Air Force, he had 452 passing yards and four touchdowns in the 48–15 victory. In the 2012 season, he passed for 4,104 yards, 37 touchdowns, and seven interceptions. He won the MWC Offensive Player of the Year for the 2012 season. Like the previous season, his passing totals were among the Mountain West Conference leaders in numerous categories.

=== 2013 season ===
Carr helped lead the Bulldogs to an 11–2 record in the 2013 season. The 11 wins marked the most for the Bulldogs since 2001.

In the regular season opener, Carr completed 52 passes on 73 attempts for 456 yards, five touchdowns, and one interception in a 52–51 victory over Rutgers. Carr's pass attempts and completions in the game set new school and conference records. Following a win over Cal Poly in the next game, Carr passed for 460 yards and four touchdowns in a victory over Boise State to move the Bulldogs to a 3–0 mark. After a victory over Hawaii in the fourth game, Carr reeled off two consecutive games with over 400 passing yards in two victories. In that stretch was a five-touchdown game against Idaho and a four-touchdown game against UNLV. The Bulldogs moved to a 7–0 mark following a victory over San Diego State on October 26. The month of November marked a start of impressive games statistically for Carr. Against Nevada, he had 487 passing yards and three touchdowns in the victory on November 2. The next week, he had 360 yards and four touchdowns in a victory over Wyoming. Two weeks later, he had 522 passing yards and seven touchdowns in a victory over New Mexico to move the Bulldogs to a 10–0 record. In that stretch, the Bulldogs earned as high of a ranking of 15 in the AP Poll, their highest since 2001. On November 29, Carr passed for 519 yards, six touchdowns, and one interceptions as the Bulldogs dropped their first game, a 62–52 shootout, to San Jose State. Fresno State qualified for the MWC Championship Game. Against Utah State, Carr passed for 404 yards, three touchdowns, and two interceptions in the 24–17 victory. The victory marked the first time Fresno State won the conference outright. He finished his collegiate career with 217 passing yards, two touchdowns, and one interception in a 45–20 loss to USC in the Las Vegas Bowl.

In the 2013 season, Carr led the FBS with 5,083 yards and 50 touchdowns. He was among the leaders in many passing categories in the conference. He was named Mountain West Male Athlete of the Year, and won the Sammy Baugh Trophy, which is awarded annually by the Touchdown Club of Columbus to the nation's top collegiate passer. He finished in eighth place in the Heisman Trophy voting.

Carr received the 2013 CFPA Elite QB Award for his performance over three seasons at Fresno State. He joined fellow Bakersfield native Phillip Thomas as the school's second CFPA winner.

While at Fresno State, he wore number 4 as a homage to his favorite NFL player, Brett Favre. Carr's number was retired by Fresno State during halftime of a game against Incarnate Word in 2017. On July 14, 2019, Carr received a mural at his former college, Fresno State University.

== Professional career ==
Pre-draft measurables
Height	Weight	Arm length	Hand span	Wingspan	40-yard dash	10-yard split	20-yard split	20-yard shuttle	Vertical jump	Broad jump	Wonderlic
6 ft 2 3/8 in (1.89 m)	214 lb (97 kg)	31 1/2 in (0.80 m)	9 1/8 in (0.23 m)	6 ft 3 in (1.91 m)	4.69 s	1.64 s	2.73 s	4.20 s	34.5 in (0.88 m)	9 ft 2 in (2.79 m)	20
All values from the NFL Combine

=== Oakland / Las Vegas Raiders ===
==== 2014 season ====
Derek Carr was considered a late-first round or early-second round draft prospect in the 2014 NFL Draft, typically rated just behind fellow quarterback prospects in Johnny Manziel and Blake Bortles, and alongside prospects like Teddy Bridgewater. Carr was selected by the Oakland Raiders in the second round of the 2014 NFL Draft with the 36th overall pick. He was the fourth quarterback selected that year. On May 16, he was assigned his requested number 4. On May 21, he was signed to a four-year, $5.37 million contract with a $2.2 million signing bonus.

On August 28, Carr impressed the coaches and fans in the Raiders' fourth and final preseason game against the Seattle Seahawks, after coming into the game as the backup to Matt Schaub and taking the Raiders down the field for three touchdowns in the first quarter, then throwing another touchdown on their next possession of the second quarter, before being relieved. For his short playing time in the game, he went 11-of-13 for 143 yards and three touchdowns for a nearly perfect quarterback rating.

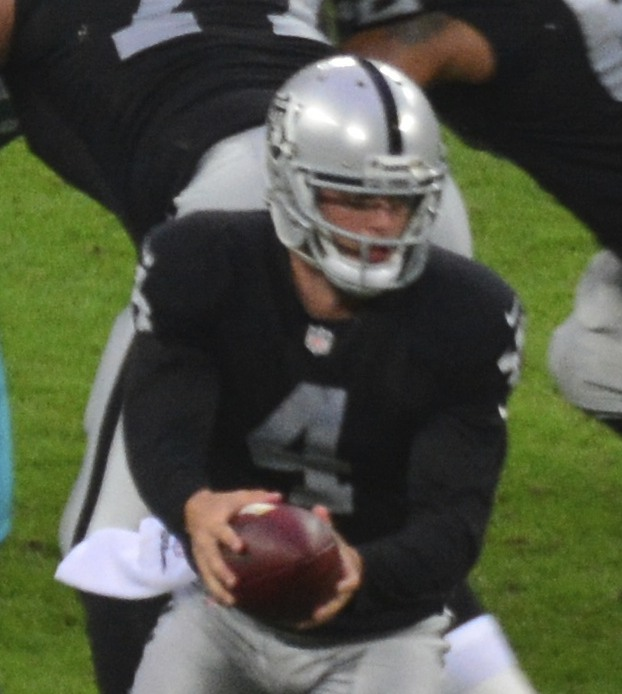
Carr with the Oakland Raiders in 2014

On September 1, Raiders head coach Dennis Allen announced that Carr would start over Schaub in the team's opener against the New York Jets, and mentioned that the decision was not week-to-week; Carr would be the Raiders starting quarterback moving forward. Carr therefore became the first rookie quarterback in Raiders history to start a season opener, and was also the only rookie quarterback from the 2014 draft class to start in Week 1.

Carr made his first career regular-season start against the Jets on September 7. During his professional debut, he passed for 151 yards and two touchdowns. The Raiders were unsuccessful during his debut and lost by a score of 19–14. In Week 4 against the Miami Dolphins at Wembley Stadium, Carr left the game due to a high ankle sprain and MCL sprain. He was relieved by Matt McGloin, but the Raiders still couldn't find their momentum, losing to the Dolphins, 38–14.

In the fifth start of his career, on October 12, facing the division-rival San Diego Chargers, Carr made history by setting a new Raiders franchise record for the most passing touchdowns in a single regular-season game by a rookie, with four. This surpassed the previous record of three passing touchdowns, which was set by McGloin during his rookie season in 2013 versus the Texans. Additionally, Carr set single-game personal records for passing yards by throwing for 282 yards, and for total passer rating which amounted to 107.7. Although Carr had a career day, the Raiders ultimately were defeated by the Chargers by the final score of 31–28.

On November 20, Carr won his first NFL game by leading the previously winless Raiders to a 24–20 upset win over the Kansas City Chiefs on Thursday Night Football. The Raiders trailed the Chiefs, 20–17, early in the fourth quarter, but Carr led them on an 80-yard drive that lasted just over 7 minutes. The fourth-quarter comeback ended with Carr throwing a game-winning touchdown pass with just under 1:40 to play. On December 7, Carr led the Raiders to a 24–13 victory over the visiting San Francisco 49ers. Carr posted a 140.2 rating, the highest for a Raiders quarterback since Rich Gannon in 2001.

Carr finished his rookie season with 3,270 passing yards, 21 touchdowns, and 12 interceptions. He became the first Raiders quarterback to start all 16 games since Gannon in 2002.

==== 2015 season ====
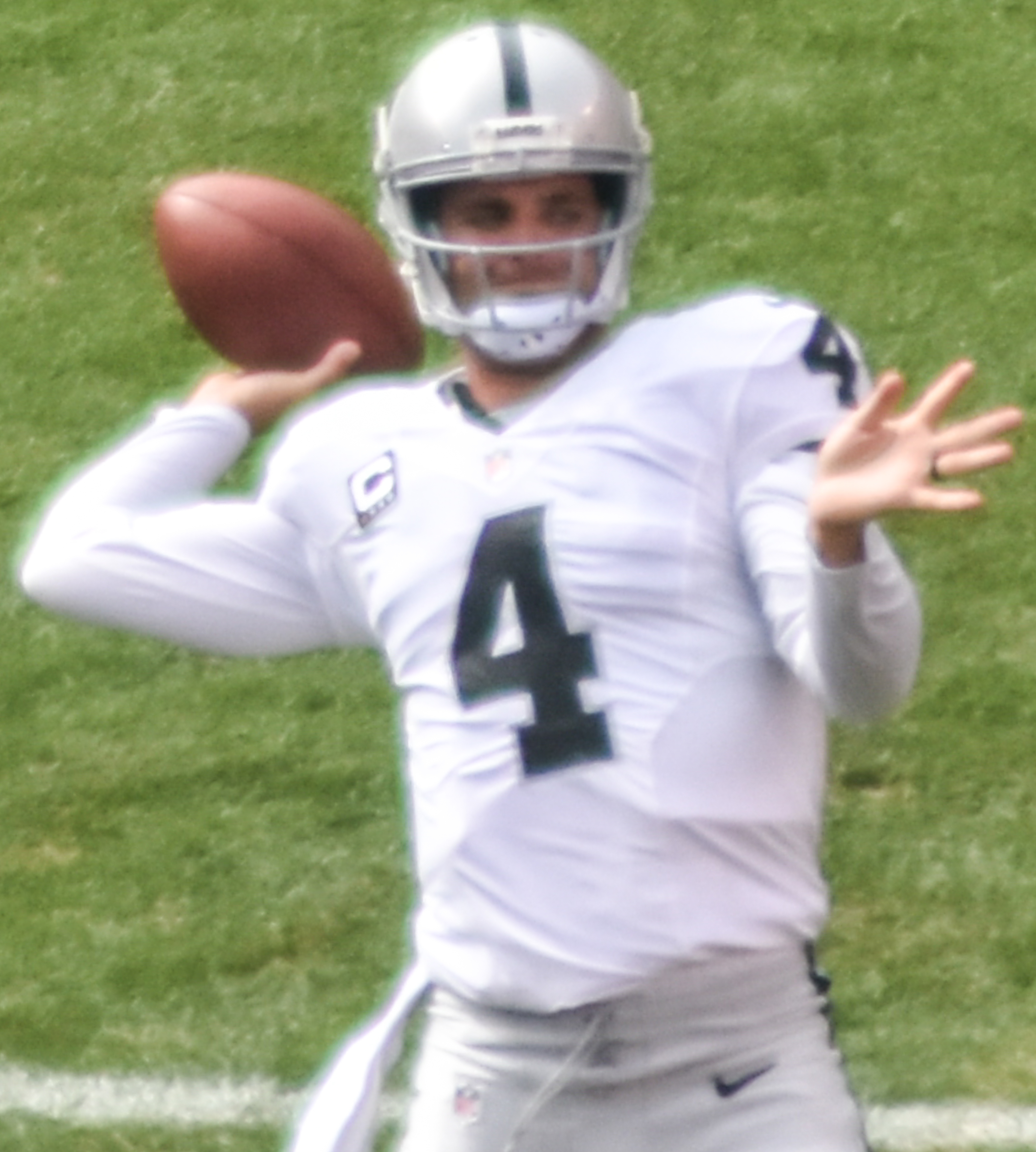
Carr in 2015

On September 13, during the Raiders' season opener against the Cincinnati Bengals, Carr exited the game early with an injury to his throwing hand. The MRI was negative and Carr returned to start in Week 2 against the Baltimore Ravens. The Raiders won 37–33 to get their first win of the season. Carr had a career day against the Ravens as he threw over 350 yards and three touchdowns, including the game-winning touchdown to wide receiver Seth Roberts with 26 seconds remaining. Carr continued his successful play into Week 3 against the Cleveland Browns. He threw for 314 yards as he helped lead the Raiders to a 27–20 win. Carr had another good performance in Week 7 on the road against the Chargers as he threw for 289 yards and three touchdowns, putting up a 137.7 passer rating. Carr threw for 333 yards and four touchdowns and a 130.9 passer rating in a win against the Jets the next week. Carr finished the 2015 season with 3,987 passing yards, 32 touchdowns, and 13 interceptions as the Raiders went 7–9.

On January 20, it was announced that he would be replacing Aaron Rodgers of the Green Bay Packers for the 2016 Pro Bowl. He became the first Raiders quarterback to be named to the Pro Bowl since Rich Gannon in 2002. After two seasons, Carr had 53 career touchdown passes, the second most by a quarterback in his first two seasons, behind Dan Marino's 68. Carr was ranked 100th by his fellow players on the NFL Top 100 Players of 2016.

==== 2016 season ====
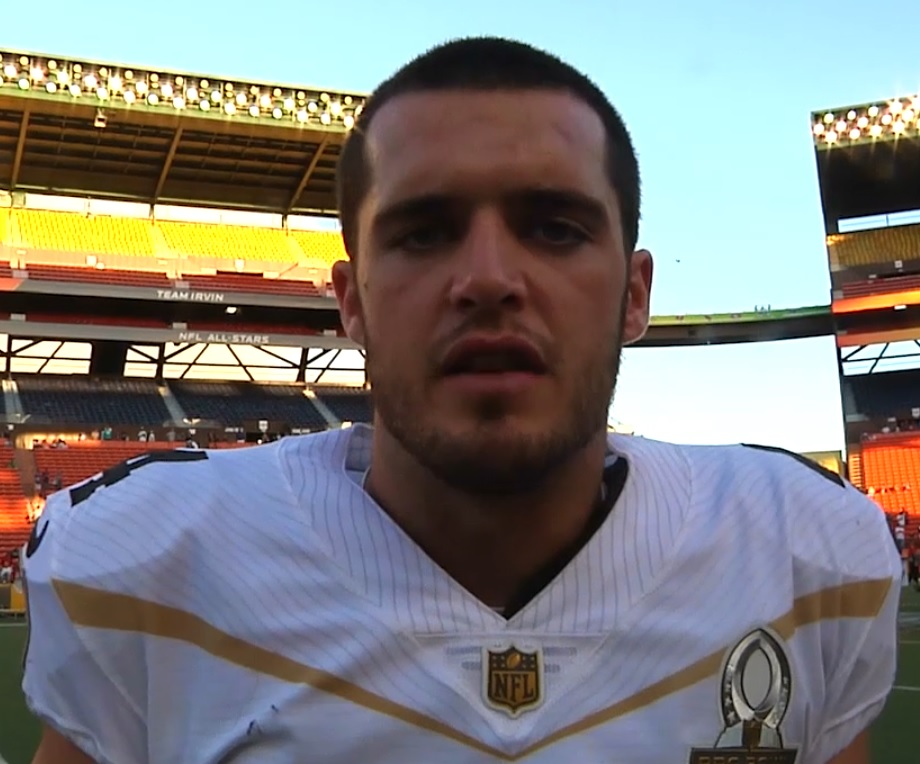
Carr at the 2016 Pro Bowl

Carr started the 2016 season off strong with 319 passing yards, a touchdown, and a late go-ahead two-point conversion in a 35–34 victory over the New Orleans Saints. During Week 8 against the Tampa Bay Buccaneers, Carr finished with 513 passing yards, a franchise record, and four touchdowns as the Raiders won 30–24 in overtime. He earned his first AFC Offensive Player of the Week honor for his performance against the Buccaneers. In a Week 9 game against the defending Super Bowl champion Denver Broncos, Carr led the Raiders to a 30–20 victory on Sunday Night Football to take sole possession of first place in the AFC West. During Week 11 against the Texans at Estadio Azteca, Carr completed 21 of 31 pass attempts for 295 yards and three touchdowns as the Raiders won 27–20. He surpassed 10,000 career passing yards and helped the Raiders take back sole possession of the division lead from the Chiefs. The following week versus the Carolina Panthers, Carr dislocated his pinkie on his throwing hand and had to miss a series. He returned the next drive with a glove on his hand and finished the game, which resulted in a 35–32 victory. The win brought the Raiders to a 9–2 record and clinched their first winning season since 2002. On December 18, with a 19–16 win over the Chargers, Carr led the Raiders to clinch their first playoff berth since 2002. Carr was named to his second consecutive Pro Bowl on December 20, 2016, but an injury sustained in Week 16 prevented him from participating.

On Christmas Eve, in Week 16, Carr left the Raiders' eventual 33–25 win against the Indianapolis Colts in the fourth quarter with a leg injury. Head coach Jack Del Rio announced after the game that Carr suffered a fibula fracture from a sack by linebacker Trent Cole and that he would be out "indefinitely." The expected recovery time was six to eight weeks. Matt McGloin then started the team's final game of the regular season, but he suffered a shoulder injury and was replaced by Connor Cook, the third-string quarterback when the season began. This made Cook the starter for the first round of the playoffs. There was a possibility that Carr could return if the Raiders were able to get to Super Bowl LI, but the Raiders lost to the Texans 27–14 in the Wild Card Round, ending their season. In 15 starts in the 2016 season, Carr recorded 3,937 passing yards on a career-high 357 completions and a career-low 560 attempts and 28 touchdowns. He was ranked 11th by his fellow players on the NFL Top 100 Players of 2017.

==== 2017 season ====
On June 22, 2017, Carr signed a five-year, $125 million contract extension with $40 million fully guaranteed, $70 million in total guarantees and a $12.5 million signing bonus. This deal surpassed Colts quarterback Andrew Luck's contract as the league's highest paid player in terms of average money per year. Carr himself was surpassed that August by Detroit Lions quarterback Matthew Stafford's $27 million annual contract.

Against the Chiefs in Week 7, Carr finished with a season-high 417 passing yards and three touchdowns. The Raiders won 31–30 on a game-winning two-yard pass from Carr to wide receiver Michael Crabtree on an untimed down that resulted from a defensive holding penalty on the previous play as time expired. During Week 15 against the Dallas Cowboys, in the closing seconds of the fourth quarter, Carr fumbled close to the endzone, resulting in a touchback, and the Raiders lost 20–17. On New Year's Eve, in the regular season finale against the Los Angeles Chargers, he threw a career-long 87-yard touchdown pass to wide receiver Amari Cooper in the 30–10 loss. Overall, in the 2017 season, the Raiders finished with a 6–10 record and missed the playoffs. Carr finished with 3,496 passing yards, 22 touchdowns, and 13 interceptions. On January 22, 2018, he was named to his third straight Pro Bowl as a replacement for the Super Bowl-bound Tom Brady. Carr was ranked 60th by his fellow players on the NFL Top 100 Players of 2018.

==== 2018 season ====
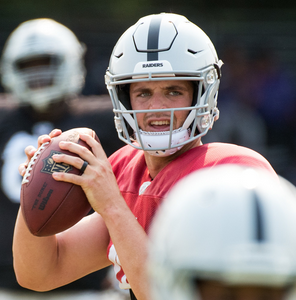
Carr in 2018

Carr entered the 2018 season with a new head coach in Jon Gruden. After a 0–3 start to the season where he threw two touchdowns to five interceptions, Carr threw for 437 yards, four touchdowns, and two interceptions in a 45–42 overtime victory in Week 4 against the Cleveland Browns. In Week 15 against the Bengals, Carr passed for 263 yard and a touchdown in a 30–16 loss, while throwing 301 passes and breaking the franchise record for most passes without an interception. With a disappointing 4–12 record, Carr finished the season with a career-high 4,049 passing yards, a career-low 19 touchdowns, and ten interceptions.

==== 2019 season ====
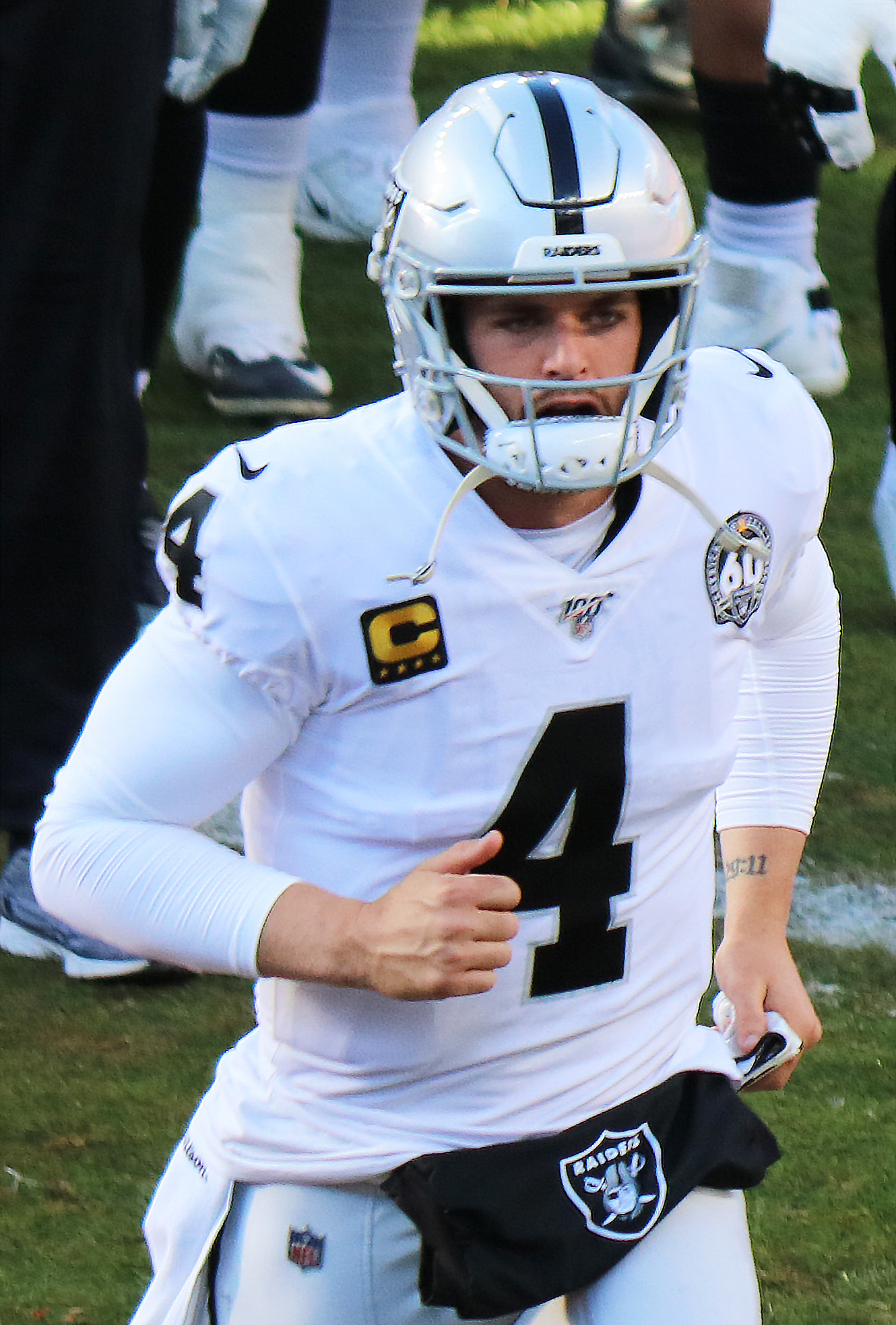
Carr in 2019

In Week 2, Carr threw for 198 yards and one touchdown, with two interceptions on 23 completions for 38 attempts, in a 28–10 loss to the Chiefs. Despite the loss, Carr surpassed Hall of Famer Ken Stabler for the Raiders' franchise all-time record for passing yards. In Week 15 against the Jacksonville Jaguars, Carr threw for 267 yards and one touchdown during the 20–16 loss. This was the Raiders' final home game of the season and their last time playing at RingCentral Coliseum. During the game, Carr eclipsed 300 completed passes during the season joining Peyton Manning as the only quarterbacks to do so in each of their first six seasons. In Week 17 against the Denver Broncos, Carr threw for 391 yards and a touchdown during the 16–15 loss. Carr finished the 2019 season with 4,054 passing yards, 21 passing touchdowns, and eight interceptions as the Raiders finished with a 7–9 record. He set a franchise record for completion percentage for quarterbacks that played the whole season. He was to first Raider to eclipse 70% with 70.4%.

==== 2020 season ====
In Week 1 against the Panthers, Carr finished with 239 passing yards and a touchdown in the 34–30 win, the first since the Raiders moved to Las Vegas. In Week 2, Carr finished with 282 passing yards and three touchdowns in the 34–24 win over the highly touted Saints on Monday Night Football, the first win at Allegiant Stadium. On October 5, Carr, along with tight ends Darren Waller and Jason Witten, and seven other Raiders players, received a $15,000 fine for violating the NFL's COVID-19 protocol. The fine resulted from Carr and the other players not wearing masks at a fundraiser held by Waller's charity. In Week 5 against the Chiefs, Carr threw for 347 yards, three touchdowns, and one interception during the 40–32 upset road win. It was Carr's first career victory at Arrowhead Stadium, as well as his first career win against Patrick Mahomes. In Week 11 against the Kansas City Chiefs on Sunday Night Football, Carr threw for 275 yards, three touchdowns, and one interception during the 35–31 loss. In Week 12 against the Atlanta Falcons, Carr threw for 215 yards and an interception that was returned for a touchdown and also lost three fumbles during the 43–6 loss. In Week 13, against the Jets, Carr had 381 passing yards, three touchdowns, and one interception in the 31–28 victory. With the Raiders trailing by four with only 13 seconds remaining, Carr threw a go-ahead 46-yard touchdown pass to Henry Ruggs.

In a Week 15 loss to the Chargers, Carr left the game in the first quarter after suffering a groin injury on a goalline play. In Week 16 against the Dolphins, Carr threw for 336 yards, including an 85-yard touchdown pass to Nelson Agholor, during the 26–25 loss. In Week 17 against the Broncos, Carr threw for 371 yards, two touchdowns, and two interceptions during the 32–31 win. Overall, in the 2020 season, Carr finished with 4,103 passing yards, 27 touchdowns, and nine interceptions as the Raiders finished with an 8–8 record.

==== 2021 season ====
Against the Ravens in Week 1, Carr finished with 435 passing yards, two touchdowns, and an interception. His 33-yard touchdown to Zay Jones ended the game as the Raiders won 33–27 in overtime. Through the first three weeks of the season, Carr led the Raiders to a 3–0 start, recording 1,203 passing yards, six touchdowns, and two interceptions with a 101.4 passer rating, earning AFC Offensive Player of the Month for the month of September. Against the Philadelphia Eagles in Week 7, Carr completed 31 of 34 passes for 323 yards, two touchdowns, an interception, and finished with a 91.2 completion percentage, the second-highest in a game in NFL history (minimum 30 attempts) as the Raiders won 33–22.

Carr advanced to the playoffs after a 35–32 overtime win against the Chargers during the regular season finale. Carr threw for a career-high 4,804 yards, as well as 23 touchdowns and 14 interceptions on the season. He set franchise records for passing attempts, passing completions, and passing yards. He finished 5th in regular season yards and 13th in touchdowns.

In his first career playoff start against the Bengals, Carr threw for 310 yards, a touchdown, but also lost a fumble and threw the game losing interception to Germaine Pratt in the 26–19 loss in the Wild Card Round. Carr was ranked 65th by his fellow players on the NFL Top 100 Players of 2022, marking his first appearance on the list in three years.

==== 2022 season ====
On April 12, 2022, Carr signed a three-year, $121.5 million contract extension with the Las Vegas Raiders, including a no-trade clause. Carr became the fifth-ranked NFL quarterback in 2022 season for average annual salary ($40.5 million) and the eighth-ranked for overall contract value. In Week 1, Carr threw for 295 yards, two touchdowns and three interceptions in a 24–19 loss to the Chargers. Carr's first win of the season came in Week 4 in a 32–23 win against the Broncos where he threw for 188 yards and completed 21 of his 34 passes. Following the Denver game, the Raiders lost four of their next five games before rattling off a three-game winning streak.

After completing just 53.3% of his passes and throwing three interceptions in a 13–10 loss to the Pittsburgh Steelers in Week 16, Carr was benched in favor of Jarrett Stidham for the remainder of the season. With the demotion, Carr and the Raiders agreed that he would step away from the team for the rest of the season to avoid being a distraction. Prior to getting benched, Carr had started 91 consecutive regular-season games for the Raiders dating back to 2017, the longest active starting streak for the same team by a quarterback. The season was particularly frustrating for Carr and the Raiders. Nine of the eleven losses for the Raiders were by one possession, with Carr playing in ten of those losses. The Raiders became the first team in NFL history to lose five games where they had double-digit second-half leads. In 15 games in the 2022 season, Carr finished with 3,522 passing yards, 24 touchdowns, and 14 interceptions (14th in yards, 12th in touchdowns, and tied for 2nd most interceptions).

On January 31, 2023, it was announced that he would be replacing Joe Burrow of the Bengals for the 2023 Pro Bowl.

The Raiders released Carr on February 14, following his decision to decline waiving a no-trade clause in his contract.

=== New Orleans Saints ===
==== 2023 season ====
On March 6, 2023, Carr signed with the Saints on a four-year contract worth $150 million, reuniting him with former 2014 Raiders head coach Dennis Allen.

On September 24, in a game against the Packers, he was removed due to a shoulder injury. He was replaced by Jameis Winston. The next day, it was reported that Carr's status would be "week to week." With the Saints sitting at 5–7, Carr helped lead them to a 4–1 stretch to close out the season where he passed for 14 touchdowns in five games, including a four-touchdown game in Week 18 against the Falcons. Carr had six games on the season going over 300 passing yards. In the 2023 season, Carr started in all 17 games and finished with 3,878 passing yards, 25 passing touchdowns, and eight interceptions. The Saints went 9–8 and missed the postseason.

==== 2024 season ====
Carr had an efficient day in the Saints' opening game against the Panthers, completing 19-of-23 passes for 200 yards and three touchdowns. His passer rating of 142.5 marked the second-highest of his career as the Saints won 47–10. On the road against the Cowboys in Week 2, Carr completed 11-of-16 passes for 243 yards and led the Saints' offense to touchdowns in their first six drives of the game as they won 44–19. In Week 5 against the Chiefs on Monday Night Football, Carr was pressured on over half of his dropbacks and ended up leaving the game midway through the fourth quarter with an oblique injury as the Saints lost 26–13.

After missing three games, Carr returned in Week 9 against the Panthers, completing 58% of his passes as the Saints lost their seventh consecutive game after starting the season 2–0. Following the loss, head coach Dennis Allen was fired, marking the second time that Allen was dismissed mid season with Carr as his starting quarterback. In Week 14 against the New York Giants, Carr fractured his hand and suffered a concussion when trying to leap for a first down, prematurely ending his season. Carr only appeared in 10 games, finishing with 2,145 passing yards, 15 passing touchdowns and five interceptions.

=== Retirement ===
Carr announced his retirement on May 10, 2025. The decision was motivated by longstanding pain in his right shoulder resulting from a labral tear as well as other significant degenerative changes to his rotator cuff. After consulting the Saints' medical team, surgery was an option, but Carr decided against it since he felt he could no longer perform at a high level.

== Career statistics ==
=== NFL ===
Legend
	Led the league
**Bold**	Career high

==== Regular season ====
Year	Team	Games			Passing									Rushing					Sacks		Fumbles	
Year	Team	GP	GS	Record	Cmp	Att	Pct	Yds	Y/A	Lng	TD	Int	Rtg	Att	Yds	Avg	Lng	TD	Sck	SckY	Fum	Lost
2014	OAK	16	16	3–13	348	599	58.1	3,270	5.5	77	21	12	76.6	29	92	3.2	**41**	0	24	149	10	4
2015	OAK	16	16	7–9	350	573	61.1	3,987	7.0	68	**32**	13	91.1	33	138	4.2	24	0	31	230	10	3
2016	OAK	15	15	**12–3**	357	560	63.8	3,937	7.0	75	28	6	96.7	39	70	1.8	13	0	16	79	5	3
2017	OAK	15	15	6–9	323	515	62.7	3,496	6.8	**87**	22	13	86.4	23	66	2.9	32	0	20	101	8	3
2018	OAK	16	16	4–12	381	553	68.9	4,049	7.3	66	19	10	93.9	24	47	2.0	15	1	**51**	**299**	12	7
2019	OAK	16	16	7–9	361	513	**70.4**	4,054	**7.9**	75	**21**	8	100.8	27	82	3.0	15	2	29	184	7	3
2020	LV	16	16	8–8	348	517	67.3	4,103	**7.9**	85	27	9	**101.4**	39	**140**	3.6	18	**3**	26	150	11	**8**
2021	LV	17	17	10–7	**428**	**626**	68.4	**4,804**	7.7	61	23	**14**	94.0	**40**	108	2.7	22	0	40	241	**13**	5
2022	LV	15	15	6–9	305	502	60.8	3,522	7.0	60	24	**14**	86.3	24	102	**4.3**	20	0	27	191	4	0
2023	NO	17	17	9–8	375	548	68.4	3,878	7.1	58	25	8	97.7	32	40	1.3	10	0	31	218	7	3
2024	NO	10	10	5–5	189	279	67.7	2,145	7.7	71	15	5	101.0	17	71	4.2	13	1	8	48	3	0
Career		169	169	77–92	3,765	5,785	65.1	41,245	7.1	87	257	112	92.8	327	956	2.9	41	7	303	1,890	90	39

==== Postseason ====
Year	Team	Games			Passing									Rushing					Sacks		Fumbles	
Year	Team	GP	GS	Record	Cmp	Att	Pct	Yds	Y/A	Lng	TD	Int	Rtg	Att	Yds	Avg	Lng	TD	Sck	SckY	Fum	Lost
2016	OAK	0	0	—	Did not play due to injury																	
2021	LV	1	1	0–1	29	54	53.7	310	5.7	26	1	1	69.2	1	20	20.0	20	0	3	28	1	1
Career		1	1	0–1	29	54	53.7	310	5.7	26	1	1	69.2	1	20	20.0	20	0	3	28	1	1

=== College ===
Legend
	Led the NCAA
**Bold**	Career high

Season	Team	Games			Passing								Rushing			
Season	Team	GP	GS	Record	Comp	Att	Pct	Yards	Avg	TD	Int	Rate	Att	Yards	Avg	TD
2009	Fresno State	5	0	0–0	10	14	**71.4**	112	**8.0**	0	0	138.6	1	0	0.0	0
2010	Fresno State	Redshirt (redshirt)														
2011	Fresno State	**13**	**13**	4–9	279	446	62.6	3,544	7.9	26	**9**	144.5	57	72	1.3	**3**
2012	Fresno State	**13**	**13**	9–4	344	511	67.3	4,104	**8.0**	37	7	155.9	**66**	1	0.0	0
2013	Fresno State	**13**	**13**	**11–2**	**454**	**659**	68.9	**5,083**	7.7	**50**	8	**156.3**	40	**117**	**2.9**	2
Career		44	39	24–15	1,087	1,630	66.7	12,843	7.9	113	24	152.8	164	190	1.2	5

=== High school ===
Year	Team	G	GS	W	Comp	Att	Pct	Yds	TD	Int
2006	Clements (TX)	12	12	8	84	162	51.9	1,246	12	7
2007	Clements (TX)	14	14	13	117	205	57.1	1,622	16	8
2008	Bakersfield Christian (CA)	13	13	12	280	413	67.0	4,067	46	9
Career		38	38	33	481	780	58.7	6,935	74	24

== Career highlights ==
=== Awards and honors ===
NFL

- 4× Pro Bowl (2015–2017, 2022)
- 4× NFL Top 100 — 100th (2016), 11th (2017), 60th (2018), 65th (2022)
- AFC Offensive Player of the Month (September 2021)
- AFC Offensive Player of the Week (Week 8, 2016)

College

- Sammy Baugh Trophy (2013)
- NCAA passing yards leader (2013)
- NCAA passing touchdowns leader (2013)
- MW Male Athlete of the Year (2013)
- 2× MW Offensive Player of the Year (2012, 2013)
- 2× First-team All-MW (2012, 2013)
- First-team All-WAC (2011)
- Fresno State Bulldogs No. 4 retired

=== Raiders franchise records ===
Carr holds multiple franchise records for the Raiders:

==== Regular season ====
- Most passing yards in a game: 513 (October 30, 2016)
- Highest pass completion percentage in a game: 91.2% (October 24, 2021)

== Post-playing career ==
The Carr brothers host the podcast Home Grown, focusing on football in a "casual and positive" manner. Derek took interest in podcasting after seeing David's son Austin run his own show.

In 2025, Carr was a studio analyst for YouTube's coverage of the NFL International Series game in Brazil. His appearance garnered positive reviews for his breakdown of plays, during which he impersonated his former coach and commentator Jon Gruden.

On August 10, 2026, Carr was hired by UCLA as a special advisor to head coach Bob Chesney. As part of his duties, he will work alongside Chesney and the Bruins' quarterbacks.

== Personal life ==
Carr's brother, David, also a quarterback, was the first overall pick in the 2002 NFL draft, taken by the Houston Texans. David played in the NFL from 2002 to 2012 with various teams. Carr's uncle, Lon Boyett, played at the tight end position for the Raiders during the 1978 season.

Carr married his wife, Heather, on June 29, 2012. The couple have three sons and a daughter. His oldest son was born with intestinal malrotation, a medical condition that tied up his intestines and required three surgeries to fix.

Carr is a Christian and has said his faith is the most important thing in his life. He has tattoos on his wrists, the left citing a verse from the Biblical Book of Jeremiah and the right depicting a Chi Rho.

== See also ==
- List of National Football League career passing yards leaders
- List of 500-yard passing games in the National Football League
- List of Division I FBS passing yardage leaders
- List of NCAA major college football yearly passing leaders
- List of NCAA major college football yearly total offense leaders
- List of family relations in American football
