= La Terrasse-sur-Dorlay =

- Commune
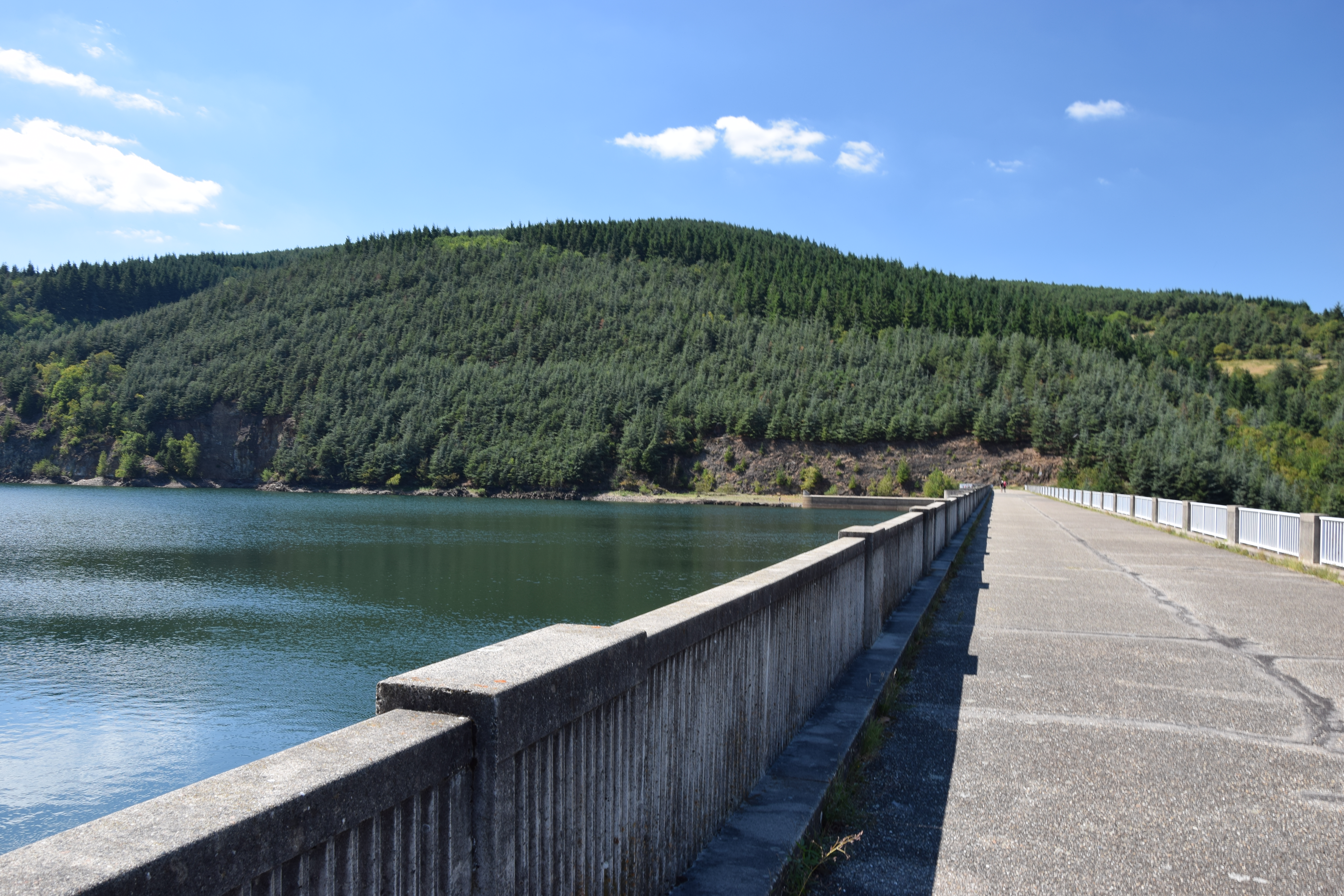
- Dam on the Dorlay

- Coat of arms
- Location of La Terrasse-sur-Dorlay
- Location within France Location within Auvergne-Rhône-Alpes
- Coordinates: 45°26′57″N 4°35′02″E
- Country: France
- Region: Auvergne-Rhône-Alpes
- Department: Loire
- Arrondissement: Saint-Étienne
- Canton: Le Pilat
- Intercommunality: Saint-Étienne Métropole

Government
  - Mayor (2020–2026): Christian Ducceschi
- Area^{1}: 8.69 km^{2} (3.36 sq mi)
- Highest elevation: 873 m (2,864 ft)
- Lowest elevation: 400 m (1,300 ft)
- Population (2023): 778
  - Density: 89.5/km^{2} (232/sq mi)
- Time zone: UTC+01:00 (CET)
  - Summer (DST): UTC+02:00 (CEST)
- INSEE/Postal code: 42308 /42740
- ^{1} French Land Register data, which excludes lakes, ponds, glaciers > 1 km^{2} (0.386 sq mi or 247 acres) and river estuaries.

La Terrasse-sur-Dorlay (French pronunciation: [la tɛʁas syʁ dɔʁlɛ]) is a commune in the Loire department in central France.

La Terrasse-sur-Dorlay takes its name from the Dorlay river, a tributary of the Gier, which flows through the commune.

== Population ==
Historical population
Year	Pop.	±% p.a.
1968	500	—
1975	465	−1.03%
1982	520	+1.61%
1990	545	+0.59%
1999	653	+2.03%
2007	715	+1.14%
2012	776	+1.65%
2017	785	+0.23%
2023	778	−0.15%
Source: INSEE

== Sights ==
The dam on the Dorlay with storage capacity of 2,500,000 cubic metres (88,000,000 cu ft), is just upstream from the village.

== See also ==
- Communes of the Loire department
