= Phillip Thomas =

American football player (born 1989)

No. 41, 43
- Position: Safety

Personal information
- Born: March 1, 1989 (age 37); Bakersfield, California, U.S.
- Listed height: 6 ft 0 in (1.83 m)
- Listed weight: 223 lb (101 kg)

Career information
- High school: Bakersfield
- College: Fresno State
- NFL draft: 2013: 4th round, 119th overall pick

Career history
- Washington Redskins (2013–2014); Miami Dolphins (2015)*; Buffalo Bills (2015–2016)
- * Offseason or practice squad member only

Awards and highlights
- Unanimous All-American (2012); MW Defensive Player of the Year (2012); First-team All-MW (2012)

Career NFL statistics
- Total tackles: 27
- Fumble recoveries: 1
- Stats at Pro Football Reference

Phillip Thomas (born March 1, 1989) is an American former professional football player who was a safety in the National Football League (NFL). He played college football for the Fresno State Bulldogs, earning unanimous All-American honors in 2012. He was selected by the Washington Redskins in the fourth round of the 2013 NFL draft.

== Early life ==
Thomas was born in Bakersfield, California. He attended Bakersfield High School, and played high school football for the Bakersfield Drillers.

== College career ==
Thomas attended California State University, Fresno, where he played for the Fresno State Bulldogs football team from 2008 to 2012. As a senior in 2012, he was named an All-American by the American Football Coaches Association (AFCA) and CBS Sports. He was also a finalist for the Jim Thorpe Award. He was named to the ESPN All-America team and winner of the 2012 CFPA Defensive Back Trophy. He became the first unanimous All-American in Fresno State history when he was named to the Associated Press All-America team.

== Professional career ==
Pre-draft measurables
Height	Weight	Arm length	Hand span	40-yard dash	Vertical jump	Broad jump	Bench press
6 ft 0 in (1.83 m)	208 lb (94 kg)	30 5/8	9 1/4	4.65 s	35 in (0.89 m)	10 ft 2 in (3.10 m)	14 reps
All values from NFL Combine.

=== Washington Redskins ===
Thomas was selected by the Washington Redskins in the fourth round, with the 119th overall pick, of the 2013 NFL draft. He officially signed a four-year contract with the team on May 17, 2013. In the first preseason game against the Tennessee Titans, he suffered a left foot injury, which was originally diagnosed as a sprain. On August 13, it was announced that Thomas would miss the entire 2013 season and be placed on injured reserve due to a torn Lisfranc ligament.

Battling hamstring and foot injuries in the preseason, the Redskins waived him on August 30, 2014 for final roster cuts before the start of the 2014 season. After clearing waivers, he was signed to the team's practice squad the following day. He was promoted to the active roster on November 1, 2014. He was waived on August 5, 2015.

=== Miami Dolphins ===
Thomas signed with the Miami Dolphins on August 10, 2015. On August 30, 2015, he was waived.

=== Buffalo Bills ===
On December 30, 2015, the Buffalo Bills signed Thomas to their practice squad. On January 4, 2016, he signed a futures contract with the Bills. On June 17, 2016, he was waived. On June 20, 2016, the Bills placed Thomas on injured reserve after clearing waivers.

On March 6, 2017, Thomas was released by the Bills.

== Personal life ==
His older brother was featured in a Frontline documentary "Stickup Kid"
