= Mike Edwards (cornerback) =

American gridiron football player (born 1991)

Profile
- Position: Cornerback

Personal information
- Born: April 26, 1991 (age 35); Cleveland, Ohio, U.S.
- Listed height: 5 ft 9 in (1.75 m)
- Listed weight: 189 lb (86 kg)

Career information
- High school: Cleveland (OH) Glenville
- College: Hawaii
- NFL draft: 2013: undrafted

Career history
- New York Jets (2013)*; Montreal Alouettes (2014); Los Angeles KISS (2015)*
- * Offseason or practice squad member only

Awards and highlights
- MW Special Teams Player of the Year (2012); First-team All-MW (2012) (Note: Selected as a first-team return specialist and a second-team defensive back.); Second-team All-MW (2012); Second-team All-WAC (2011)

Mike Edwards
Medal record

Men's American football

Representing United States

World Championship
Gold medal – first place	2015 USA	Team competition

Mike Edwards (born April 26, 1991) is an American former professional football cornerback. He was signed by the New York Jets as an undrafted free agent in 2013. He played college football for the Hawaii Warriors of the University of Hawaii. In 2012, he led all college football players in kickoff return yards.

== Early life ==
Edwards attended Glenville High School in Cleveland, Ohio, and was a member of the school's football and track teams. He helped the football team reach the regional semi-finals as a senior. Edwards scored his team's sole touchdown in an 8–7 loss to Cleveland St. Ignatius. As a senior, he had 34 tackles and five interceptions and was named to the All-State first-team.

== College career ==
Edwards played for the University of Tennessee in 2009. He appeared in eight games and had five tackles. He then redshirted the 2010 season at Coffeyville Community College.

In 2011, Edwards went to the University of Hawaii and started 12 games at cornerback. He had 43 tackles that season. He also had 44 kick returns, and his 24.7 yard average was second-best in the WAC.

In 2012, Edwards led all college football players with 1,215 kickoff return yards and had a 30.4 yard average. His three kickoff returns for touchdowns set a Hawaii single-season record. Edwards also had 43 tackles. He was named the Mountain West Conference's Special Teams Player of the Year. After the season, Edwards entered the NFL draft. He finished his career at Hawaii with 2,301 total kickoff return yards, which was a school record.

== Professional career ==
Pre-draft measurables
Height	Weight	Arm length	Hand span	40-yard dash	10-yard split	20-yard split	20-yard shuttle	Three-cone drill	Vertical jump	Broad jump	Bench press
5 ft 9 in (1.75 m)	189 lb (86 kg)	31 5/8 in (0.80 m)	9 1/8 in (0.23 m)	4.42 s	1.57 s	2.63 s	4.18 s	6.94 s	36.0 in (0.91 m)	10 ft 4 in (3.15 m)	14 reps
All values from NFL Combine/Pro Day

=== New York Jets ===
Edwards signed with the New York Jets as an undrafted free agent following the 2013 NFL draft. He was released on August 31, 2013.

=== Los Angeles KISS ===
On October 28, 2014, Edwards was assigned to the Los Angeles KISS of the Arena Football League. On March 20, 2015, Edwards was placed on recallable reassignment.

== Personal life ==
Edwards was born in Cleveland, Ohio, to Mike and Tameeka Edwards. He has one brother, two sisters, and one son and one daughter. Edwards was a sociology major. He is 5 feet, 10 inches tall, and weighs 186 pounds.

After his freshman season at Tennessee, Edwards and some of his teammates held up some people with a pellet gun. He was charged with three counts of attempted armed robbery. He pleaded down to a lesser charge and was sentenced to two years probation.
