= 2012 Mountain West Conference football season =

- League: NCAA Division I FBS (Football Bowl Subdivision)
- Sport: Football
- Duration: August 30, 2012–January 2013
- Teams: 10
- TV partner(s): The Mtn., CBS Sports Network, Versus

2013 NFL Draft
- Top draft pick: TE Gavin Escobar, San Diego State
- Picked by: Dallas Cowboys, 47th overall

Regular season
- Co-champions: Fresno State, San Diego State, Boise State

Football seasons
- 2011 2013

2012 Mountain West Conference football standings
	Conf.			Overall
Team	W		L	W		L
No. 18 Boise State +	7	–	1	11	–	2
Fresno State +	7	–	1	9	–	4
San Diego State +	7	–	1	9	–	4
Air Force	5	–	3	6	–	7
Nevada	4	–	4	7	–	6
Wyoming	3	–	5	4	–	8
Colorado State	3	–	5	4	–	8
UNLV	2	–	6	2	–	11
New Mexico	1	–	7	4	–	9
Hawaii	1	–	7	3	–	9
+ – Conference co-champions; Rankings from AP Poll

The 2012 Mountain West Conference football season was the 14th season of college football for the Mountain West Conference (MW). In the 2012 NCAA Division I FBS football season, the MW had 10 football members: Air Force, Boise State, Colorado State, Fresno State, Hawaiʻi, Nevada, New Mexico, San Diego State, UNLV, and Wyoming.

This was the second consecutive year in which the Mountain West saw changes in membership. After losing two of its charter members in 2011—BYU (WCC and football independent) and Utah (Pac-12)—the MW lost TCU, members since 2005, to the Big 12 in 2012. The conference reloaded with three new members—full conference members Fresno State and Nevada, and football-only Hawaiʻi.

This was originally intended to be the last season for Boise State and San Diego State in the MW. After the 2012–13 school year, both schools' football programs planned to join the Big East. Both schools also planned to join the Big West, a former conference home of both, for non-football sports. San Diego State, a charter member of the Big West, was set to return to that conference after a 35-year absence; Boise State was set to return after a 12-year absence. However, due to major instability in the Big East, culminating in the mass exodus of the conference's seven basketball-first schools in December 2012, Boise State chose to remain in the MW for 2013 and beyond. San Diego State has since sought to remain in the MW, and as a part of Boise State's agreement to remain in the MW, the conference must offer an invitation to San Diego State to remain in the MW before it can invite any other school.

In addition, San Jose State and Utah State will join the MW in 2013.

== Preseason ==
=== Award watch lists ===
The following Mountain West players were named to preseason award watch lists.

Maxwell Award:

Chuck Bednarik Award:

John Mackey Award:

Fred Biletnikoff Award:

Bronko Nagurski Trophy:

Outland Trophy:

Jim Thorpe Award:

Lombardi Award:

Rimington Trophy:

Davey O'Brien Award:

Doak Walker Award:

Walter Camp Award:

Lott Trophy:

Lou Groza Award:

== Coaches ==
NOTE: Stats shown are before the beginning of the season

Team	Head coach	Years at school	Overall record	Record at school	MW record
Air Force	Troy Calhoun	6	34–18	34–18	21–11
Boise State	Chris Petersen	7	61–5	61–5	0–0*
Colorado State	Jim McElwain	1			
Fresno State	Tim DeRuyter	1			
Hawaiʻi	Norm Chow	1			
Nevada	Chris Ault	24	226–103–1	226–103–1	
New Mexico	Bob Davie	1			
San Diego State	Rocky Long	2	65–69	0–0	40–34^
UNLV	Bobby Hauck	3	82–28	2–11	2–6
Wyoming	Dave Christensen	4	10–15	10–15	5–11

*first year as conference member, ^achieved as head coach of New Mexico from 99–08

== Rankings ==
Legend
	Increase in ranking
	Decrease in ranking
	Unranked the previous week
RV	Received votes but were not ranked in Top 25 of poll

		Pre	Wk 2	Wk 3	Wk 4	Wk 5	Wk 6	Wk 7	Wk 8	Wk 9	Wk 10	Wk 11	Wk 12	Wk 13	Wk 14	Wk 15	Final
Air Force	AP																
Air Force	C																
Air Force	Harris	Not released															
Air Force	BCS	Not released															
Boise State	AP	24	RV	RV	24	24	RV	24	24	21	19	RV	RV	RV	25	20	18
Boise State	C	22	25	RV	RV	RV	25	22	22	18	14	24	22	22	15	15	14
Boise State	Harris	Not released						22	23	19	17	23	23	21	17	15	
Boise State	BCS	Not released							22	21	19			22	20	19	
Colorado State	AP																
Colorado State	C																
Colorado State	Harris	Not released															
Colorado State	BCS	Not released															
Fresno State	AP				RV							RV	RV	RV	RV	RV	
Fresno State	C											RV	RV	RV	RV	RV	
Fresno State	Harris	Not released						RV					RV	RV	RV	RV	
Fresno State	BCS	Not released															
Hawaiʻi	AP																
Hawaiʻi	C																
Hawaiʻi	Harris	Not released															
Hawaiʻi	BCS	Not released															
Nevada	AP																
Nevada	C		RV	RV				RV	RV								
Nevada	Harris	Not released						RV	RV	RV							
Nevada	BCS	Not released															
New Mexico	AP																
New Mexico	C																
New Mexico	Harris	Not released															
New Mexico	BCS	Not released															
San Diego State	AP											RV	RV	RV	RV	RV	
San Diego State	C											RV	RV	RV	RV	RV	
San Diego State	Harris	Not released										RV	RV	RV	RV	RV	
San Diego State	BCS	Not released															
UNLV	AP																
UNLV	C																
UNLV	Harris	Not released															
UNLV	BCS	Not released															
Wyoming	AP																
Wyoming	C																
Wyoming	Harris	Not released															
Wyoming	BCS	Not released															

== Bowl games ==
The Mountain West Conference will have agreements with the following bowls for 2012–13:

- The MW champion will receive an automatic berth in one of the five BCS bowl games if they are the highest ranked non-automatic qualifying conference champion and either of the following:
  - Ranked in the top 12 of the BCS Rankings. (Utah qualified under this criterion in 2004-05 and 2008–09, and TCU in 2009-10 and 2010–11.)
  - Ranked in the top 16 of the BCS Rankings and its ranking is higher than that of an automatic qualifying conference champion.

Pick	Name	Location	Opposing Conference	Opposing Pick
1	Maaco Bowl Las Vegas	Las Vegas, Nevada	Pac-12	5
2	Poinsettia Bowl	San Diego, California	BYU (2012), Army (2013)	–
3	Armed Forces Bowl	Fort Worth, Texas	C-USA (2012), Navy (2013)	3, –
4	New Mexico Bowl	Albuquerque, New Mexico	Pac-12	7
5	Hawai'i Bowl	Honolulu, Hawaii	C-USA	2

If Hawai‘i is bowl eligible and not MW champions or selected for a BCS bowl, they will receive a berth in the Hawai‘i Bowl.

== Regular season ==
Index to colors and formatting
Mountain West member won
Mountain West member lost
Mountain West teams in **bold**

All dates, times, and TV are tentative and subject to change.

The Mountain West has teams in 3 different time zones. Times reflect start time in respective time zone of each team (Mountain—Air Force, Boise State, Colorado State, New Mexico, Wyoming; Pacific—Fresno State, Nevada, San Diego State, UNLV; Hawaii-Aleutian—Hawaiʻi). Conference games start times are that of the home team.

=== Week One ===
Date	Time	Visiting team	Home team	Site	TV	Result	Attendance	Ref.
August 30	8:00 pm	Minnesota	**UNLV**	Sam Boyd Stadium • Whitney, NV	CBSSN	**L** Minn 30-27	16,013	
August 31	6:00 pm	No. 24 **Boise State**	No. 13 Michigan State	Spartan Stadium • East Lansing, MI	ESPN	**L** MSU 17-13	78,709	
September 1	12:00 pm	Idaho State	**Air Force**	Falcon Stadium • Colorado Springs, CO		**W** AF 49-21	35,282	
September 1	12:00 pm	**Nevada**	California	California Memorial Stadium • Berkeley, CA	P12N	**W** NV 31-24	63,186	
September 1	1:30 pm	**Hawaii**	No. 1 USC	Los Angeles Memorial Coliseum • Los Angeles, CA	FOX	**L** USC	93,607	
September 1	2:00 pm	**Colorado State**	Colorado	Sports Authority Field at Mile High • Denver, CO	FX	**W** CSU 22-17	58,607	
September 1	3:00 pm	Southern	**New Mexico**	University Stadium • Albuquerque, NM		**W** NM 66-21	28,450	
September 1	6:00 pm	**Wyoming**	No. 15 Texas	Darrell K Royal–Texas Memorial Stadium • Austin, TX	LHN	**L** UT 37-17	101,142	
September 1	7:00 pm	Weber State	**Fresno State**	Bulldog Stadium • Fresno, CA		**W** FSU 37-10	27,663	
September 1	7:30 pm	**San Diego**	Washington	CenturyLink Field • Seattle, WA	P12N	**L** UW 21-12	53,742	
^{#}Rankings from AP Poll released prior to game.

=== Week Two ===
Date	Time	Visiting team	Home team	Site	TV	Result	Attendance	Ref.
September 8	5:00 pm	North Dakota State	**Colorado State**	Sonny Lubick Field at Hughes Stadium • Fort Collins, CO	KTVD 20	**L** NDSU 22-7	23,567	
September 8	3:30 pm	**Air Force**	No. 19 Michigan	Michigan Stadium • Ann Arbor. MI		**L** MICH 31-25	112,522	
September 8	12:30 pm	South Florida	**Nevada**	Mackay Stadium • Reno, NV	CBSSN	**L** USF 32-31	22,804	
September 8	7:00 pm	Northern Arizona	**UNLV**	Sam Boyd Stadium • Whitney, NV		**L** NAU 17-14	15,257	
September 8		**Fresno State**	No. 4 Oregon	Autzen Stadium • Eugene, OR	P12N	**L** ORE 42-25	-	
September 8	4:40 pm	Army	**San Diego State**	Qualcomm Stadium • San Diego, CA		**W** SDSU 42-7	30,799	
September 8	7:00 pm	**New Mexico**	No. 17 Texas	Darrell K Royal–Texas Memorial Stadium • Austin, TX	LHN	**L** UT 45-0	100,990	
September 8	2:00 pm	Toledo	**Wyoming**	War Memorial Stadium • Laramie, WY		**L** TOL 34-31	21,688	
^{#}Rankings from AP Poll released prior to game.

=== Week Three ===
Date	Time	Visiting team	Home team	Site	TV	Result	Attendance	Ref.
September 15	2:00 pm	Miami (OH)	**Boise State**	Bronco Stadium • Boise, ID		**W** BSU 39-12	34,178	
September 15	5:00 pm	Colorado	**Fresno State**	Bulldog Stadium • Fresno, CA		**W** FRES 69-14	-	
September 15	6:00 pm	Lamar	**Hawaii**	Aloha Stadium • Halawa, HI	PPV Oceanic	**W** HAW 54-2	31,442	
September 15	5:00 pm	Northwestern State	**Nevada**	Mackay Stadium • Reno, NV		**W** NEV 45-34	19,399	
September 15	5:00 pm	North Dakota	**San Diego State**	Qualcomm Stadium • San Diego, CA		**W** SDSU 49-41	24,826	
September 15	5:00 pm	**Colorado State**	San Jose State	Spartan Stadium • San Jose, CA		**L** SJSU 40-20	7,189	
September 15	5:00 pm	**New Mexico**	Texas Tech	Jones AT&T Stadium • Lubbock, TX		**L** TTU 49-14	-	
September 15	2:00 pm	Cal Poly	**Wyoming**	War Memorial Stadium • Laramie, WY		**L** CAL 24-22	21,728	
^{#}Rankings from AP Poll released prior to game.

== Home attendance ==
Team	Stadium	Capacity	Game 1	Game 2	Game 3	Game 4	Game 5	Game 6	Game 7	Total	Average	% of Capacity
Air Force	Falcon Stadium	52,480	35,282	38,562	38,927	29,726	24,277	25,213	—	191,987	31,998	60.97%
Boise State	Bronco Stadium	37,000	34,178	36,864	35,742	36,012	36,084	33,545	—	212,425	35,404	95.69%
Colorado State	Hughes Stadium	34,400	23,567	23,374	25,814	16,573	13,887	12,286	—	115,501	19,250	55.96%
Fresno State	Bulldog Stadium	41,031	27,663	27,513	33,894	29,423	30,755	36,240	—	185,488	30,915	75.35%
Hawaiʻi	Aloha Stadium	50,000	31,442	31,417	31,632	29,471	28,359	27,865	—	180,186	30,031	60.06%
Nevada	Mackay Stadium	29,993	22,804	19,399	24,025	22,242	22,104	30,017	—	140,591	23,432	78.12%
New Mexico	University Stadium	38,634	28,450	28,270	22,135	19,856	17,839	17,290	—	133,840	22,307	57.74%
San Diego State	Qualcomm Stadium	71,294	30,799	24,826	24,103	50,586	27,133	23,874	30,266	211,587	30,227	42.40%
UNLV	Sam Boyd Stadium	36,800	16,013	15,257	17,015	14,054	20,565	12,835	10,717	106,456	15,208	41.33%
Wyoming	War Memorial Stadium	34,000	21,688	21,728	22,627	17,855	20,055	13,374	—	117,327	19,555	57.51%

== Awards and honors ==
=== All Conference teams ===
- Offensive Player of the Year: Derek Carr, JR., QB, Fresno State
- Defensive Player of the Year: Phillip Thomas, SR., DB, Fresno State
- Special Teams Player of the Year: Mike Edwards, JR., KR, Hawai'i
- Freshman of the Year: Davante Adams, WR, Fresno State
- Coach of the Year: Rocky Long, San Diego State

Offense:

Pos.	Name	Yr.	School	Name	Yr.	School
First Team				Second Team		
QB	Derek Carr	JR.	Fresno State	Cody Fajardo	SO.	Nevada
WR	Davante Adams	FR.	Fresno State	Matt Miller	SO.	Boise State
WR	Brandon Wimberly	GR.	Nevada	Chris McNeil	SR.	Wyoming
RB	Robbie Rouse	SR.	Fresno State	Kasey Carrier	JR.	New Mexico
RB	Stefphon Jefferson	JR.	Nevada	Adam Muema	SO.	San Diego State
TE	Gavin Escobar	JR.	San Diego State	Zach Sudfeld	GR.	Nevada
OL	Matt Paradis	JR.	Boise State	Jordan Eason	SR.	Air Force
OL	Austin Wentworth	JR.	Fresno State	Charles Leno	JR.	Boise State
OL	Nik Embernate	SR.	San Diego State	Brenel Myers	SR.	Boise State
OL	Jeff Nady	SR.	Nevada	Chris Barker	SR.	Nevada
OL	Nick Carlson	SR.	Wyoming	Alex Johnson	SR.	San Diego State
PK	Nolan Kohorst	JR.	UNLV	Jared Roberts	SO.	Colorado State
PR/KR	Mike Edwards	JR.	Hawai'i	Khalid Wooten	SR.	Nevada

Defense:

Pos.	Name	Yr.	School	Name	Yr.	School
First Team				Second Team		
DL	Mike Atkinson	SR.	Boise State	Lanston Tanyi	GR.	Colorado State
DL	DeMarcus Lawrence	SO.	Boise State	Andy Jennings	JR.	Fresno State
DL	Tyeler Davison	SO.	Fresno State	Paipai Falemalu	SR.	Hawai'i
DL	Mike Purcell	SR.	Wyoming	Brock Hekking	SO.	Nevada
LB	J. C. Percy	SR.	Boise State	Alex Means	SR.	Air Force
LB	Albert Rosette	GR.	Nevada	Travis Brown	SR.	Fresno State
LB	John Lotulelei	SR.	UNLV	Jake Fely	SO.	San Diego State
DB	Jamar Taylor	SR.	Boise State	Jerrell Gavins	SR.	Boise State
DB	Phillip Thomas	SR.	Fresno State	Mike Edwards	JR.	Hawai'i
DB	Derron Smith	SO.	Fresno State	Duke Williams	SR.	Nevada
DB	Leon McFadden	SR.	San Diego State	Nat Berhe	JR.	San Diego State
P	Pete Kontodiakos	SR.	Colorado State	Alex Dunnachie	SR.	Hawai'i
