= Dorlay =

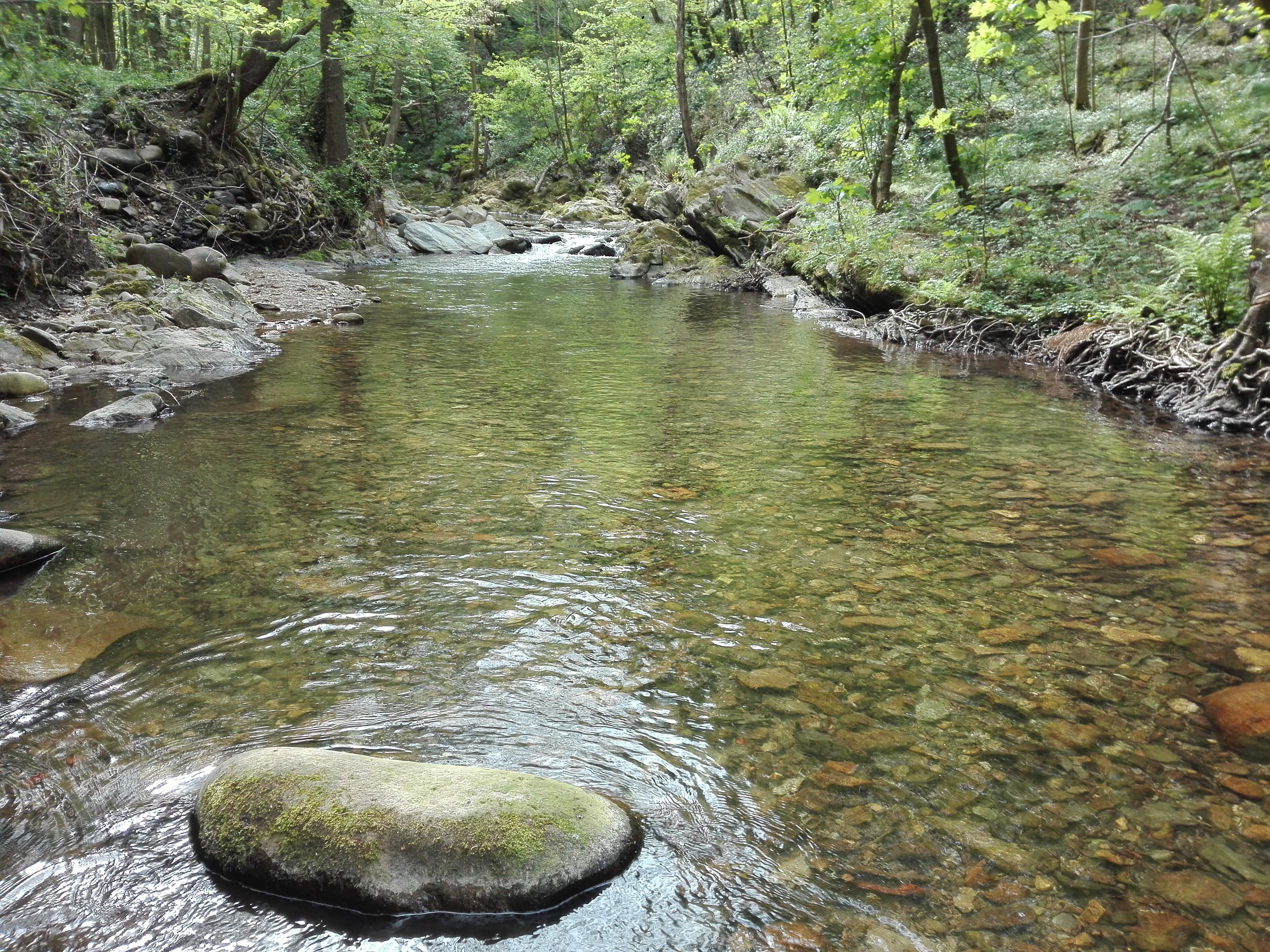

- Location within France Location within Auvergne-Rhône-Alpes

Location
- Country: France
- Region: Auvergne-Rhône-Alpes

Physical characteristics
- Source
  - location: Mont Pilat
- Mouth
  - location: Gier
  - coordinates: 45°30′35″N 4°34′13″E
- Length: 15.6 km (9.7 mi)

Basin features
- Progression: Gier→ Rhône→ Mediterranean Sea

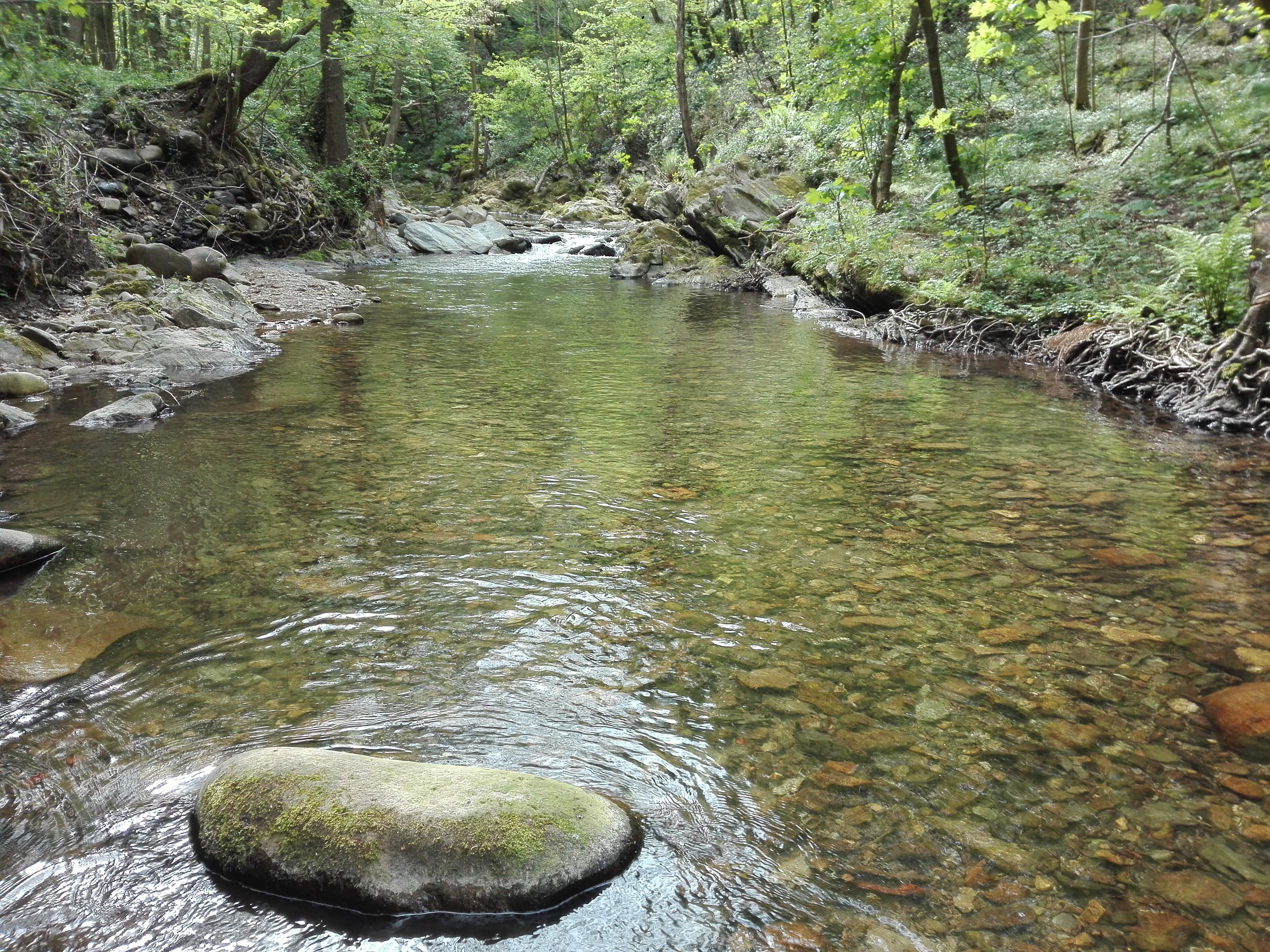
Dorlay river

The Dorlay (French pronunciation: [dɔʁlɛ]) is a river that flows through the Loire department, France. It is a tributary of the Gier, which in turn is a tributary of the Rhône. The Gier valley was formerly heavily industrialized with coal and iron mines and factories.

== Basin ==
The Dorlay rises in Mont Pilat. It is 15.6 kilometres (9.7 mi) long. Tributaries are the Artiole, Mornante and Sellon. The Mornante and Sellon are known for the presence of white-clawed crayfish, a heritage species. The catchment area is about 50 square kilometres (19 sq mi) The source of the river is at an altitude of over 1,400 metres (4,600 ft), while the average elevation of the basin is 730 metres (2,400 ft) The upper part of the basin is forested or pastureland.

== Communities ==
A manuscript of 1200 gives the river the Latin name of Dorleum. In 1224 it is called Aqua de Dorllei. Subsequent mentions call it Rivus de Dorlay (1359), Dorleys (1527), Dourley (1718) and Dourlay (1789). It flows through the communes of La Grand-Croix, Saint-Paul-en-Jarez, Lorette, La Terrasse-sur-Dorlay and Doizieux. In the past, the river powered many weaving workshops in the valley.

== Dam ==
Construction of a dam on the Dorlay by the town of Rive-de-Gier was discussed in 1884 but the project was abandoned due to cost.

Today's Barrage du Dorlay is located at 45.443302°N 4.578356°E on the river between Doizieux and La Terrasse-sur-Dorlay. It was built between 1971 and 1973. The dam has a storage capacity of 2,500,000 cubic metres (88,000,000 cu ft), with a catchment area of about 24.4 square kilometres (9.4 sq mi). It is at an altitude of about 500 metres (1,600 ft). The dam supplies potable water to the municipalities of La-Terrasse-sur-Dorlay, Lorette, Chateauneuf, Chagnon, Cellieu, St-Paul-en-Jarez, La Grand-Croix and part of Rive-de-Gier. In 2008 it supplied about 1,370,000 cubic metres (48,000,000 cu ft) of water to about 22,630 people. Since the dam is used for drinking water, swimming is not allowed - but some people swim anyway. Some local people use the dam for canoeing, but there are no rental boats.

== Coal ==
In 1730 a large coal seam was found along the Dorlay. A number of mines were sunk to a depth of 40 metres (130 ft) or more. These were worked for a short period, then abandoned due to lack of pumping equipment. Mining resumed in 1776 with pumps operating, but was abandoned in 1792 due to the volume of water entering the mines from the Dorlay. The river's path marks a geological fault in the Loire coal basin. In 1838 the Saint-Philippe mines were sunk on the right bank of the Dorlay to a depth of 170 metres (560 ft), but did not find any significant coal deposits.
