= Doizieux =

- Commune
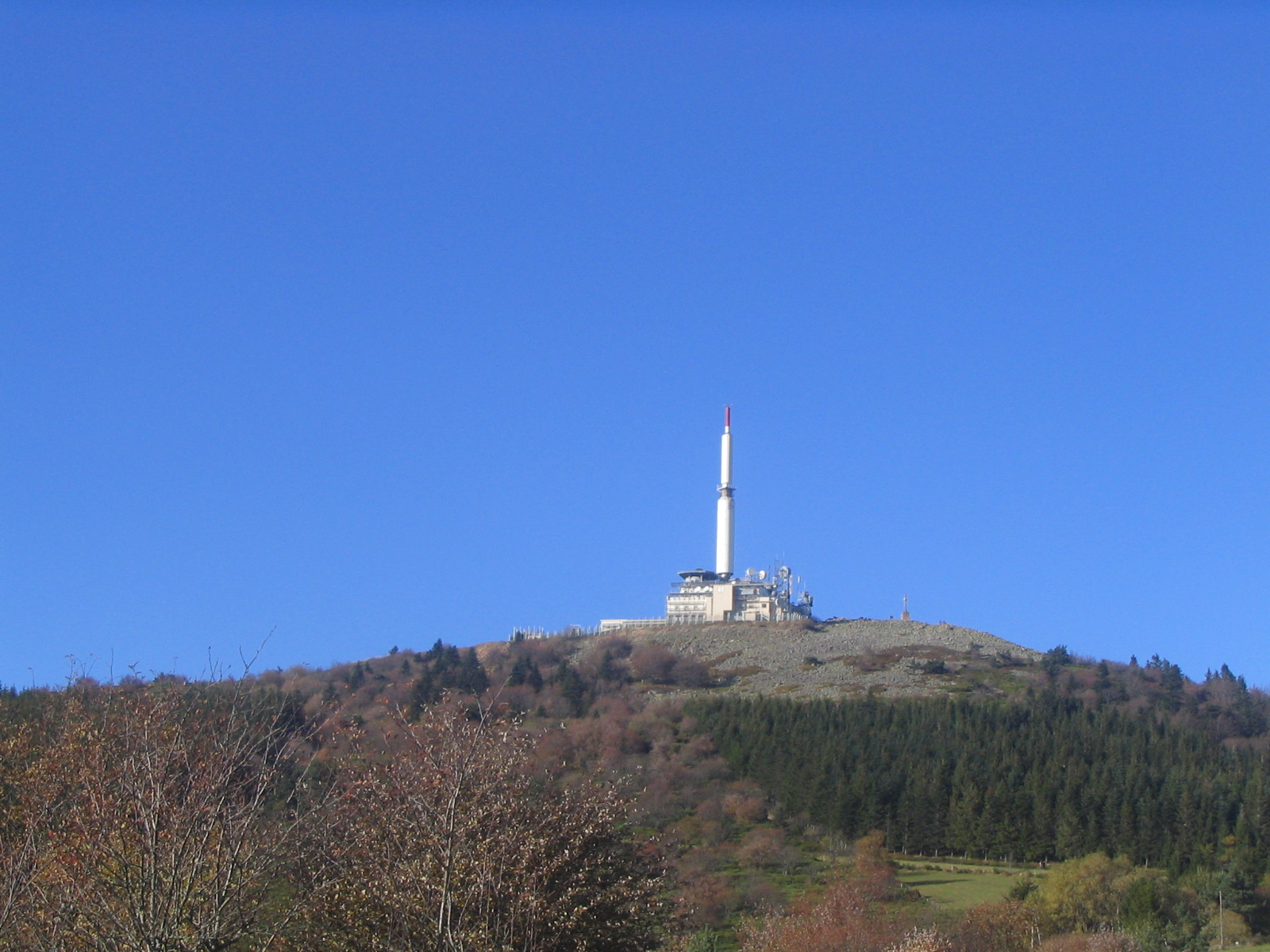
- Crêt de l'Oeillon
- Location of Doizieux
- Location within France Location within Auvergne-Rhône-Alpes
- Coordinates: 45°25′41″N 4°35′12″E
- Country: France
- Region: Auvergne-Rhône-Alpes
- Department: Loire
- Arrondissement: Saint-Étienne
- Canton: Le Pilat
- Intercommunality: Saint-Étienne Métropole

Government
  - Mayor (2020–2026): Jean-Philippe Porcherot
- Area^{1}: 28.07 km^{2} (10.84 sq mi)
- Elevation: 640 m (2,100 ft)
- Highest elevation: 1,396 m (4,580 ft)
- Lowest elevation: 440 m (1,440 ft)
- Population (2023): 856
  - Density: 30.5/km^{2} (79.0/sq mi)
- Time zone: UTC+01:00 (CET)
  - Summer (DST): UTC+02:00 (CEST)
- INSEE/Postal code: 42085 /42740
- ^{1} French Land Register data, which excludes lakes, ponds, glaciers > 1 km^{2} (0.386 sq mi or 247 acres) and river estuaries.

Doizieux (French pronunciation: [dwazjø]) is a commune in the Loire department in central France.

== Geography ==
The village is situated 50 kilometres (31 mi) southwest of Lyon. It is in the heart of the Parc naturel régional du Pilat.

The Dorlay river, a tributary of the Gier that rises in Mont Pilat, flows through the commune.

== Administration ==
Term	Mayor
2008–2014	Dominique Crozet
2014–2026	Jean-Philippe Porcherot

== Population ==
Historical population
Year	Pop.	±% p.a.
1968	520	—
1975	478	−1.20%
1982	521	+1.24%
1990	594	+1.65%
1999	645	+0.92%
2007	789	+2.55%
2012	837	+1.19%
2017	831	−0.14%
2023	856	+0.50%
Source: INSEE

== See also ==
- Communes of the Loire department
