= Saint-Paul-en-Jarez =

- Commune
- Coat of arms
- Location of Saint-Paul-en-Jarez
- Location within France Location within Auvergne-Rhône-Alpes
- Coordinates: 45°29′02″N 4°34′30″E
- Country: France
- Region: Auvergne-Rhône-Alpes
- Department: Loire
- Arrondissement: Saint-Étienne
- Canton: Rive-de-Gier
- Intercommunality: Saint-Étienne Métropole

Government
  - Mayor (2020–2026): Kamel Bouchou
- Area^{1}: 19.98 km^{2} (7.71 sq mi)
- Elevation: 420 m (1,380 ft)
- Highest elevation: 947 m (3,107 ft)
- Lowest elevation: 313 m (1,027 ft)
- Population (2023): 4,699
  - Density: 235.2/km^{2} (609.1/sq mi)
- Time zone: UTC+01:00 (CET)
  - Summer (DST): UTC+02:00 (CEST)
- INSEE/Postal code: 42271 /42740
- ^{1} French Land Register data, which excludes lakes, ponds, glaciers > 1 km^{2} (0.386 sq mi or 247 acres) and river estuaries.

Saint-Paul-en-Jarez (French pronunciation: [sɛ̃ pɔl ɑ̃ ʒaʁɛ]) is a commune in the Loire department in central France.

== Geography ==
The Dorlay river, a tributary of the Gier that rises in the Pilat massif, flows through the commune.

== Population ==
Historical population

Year	Pop.	±% p.a.
1793	2,300	—
1821	2,845	+0.76%
1846	4,328	+1.69%
1872	3,305	−1.03%
1901	3,944	+0.61%
1926	2,617	−1.63%
1946	2,313	−0.62%
1962	2,561	+0.64%
1968	2,600	+0.25%

Year	Pop.	±% p.a.
1975	3,360	+3.73%
1982	3,819	+1.85%
1990	4,179	+1.13%
1999	4,129	−0.13%
2007	4,018	−0.34%
2012	4,315	+1.44%
2017	4,844	+2.34%
2023	4,699	−0.51%

Source: EHESS and INSEE (1968-2023)

== Twin towns ==
Saint-Paul-en-Jarez is twinned with:

- Herbertingen, Germany

== Notable residents ==
- Jacques Lisfranc de Saint Martin

== See also ==
- Communes of the Loire department
