= Lisfranc ligament =

Ligament of the foot

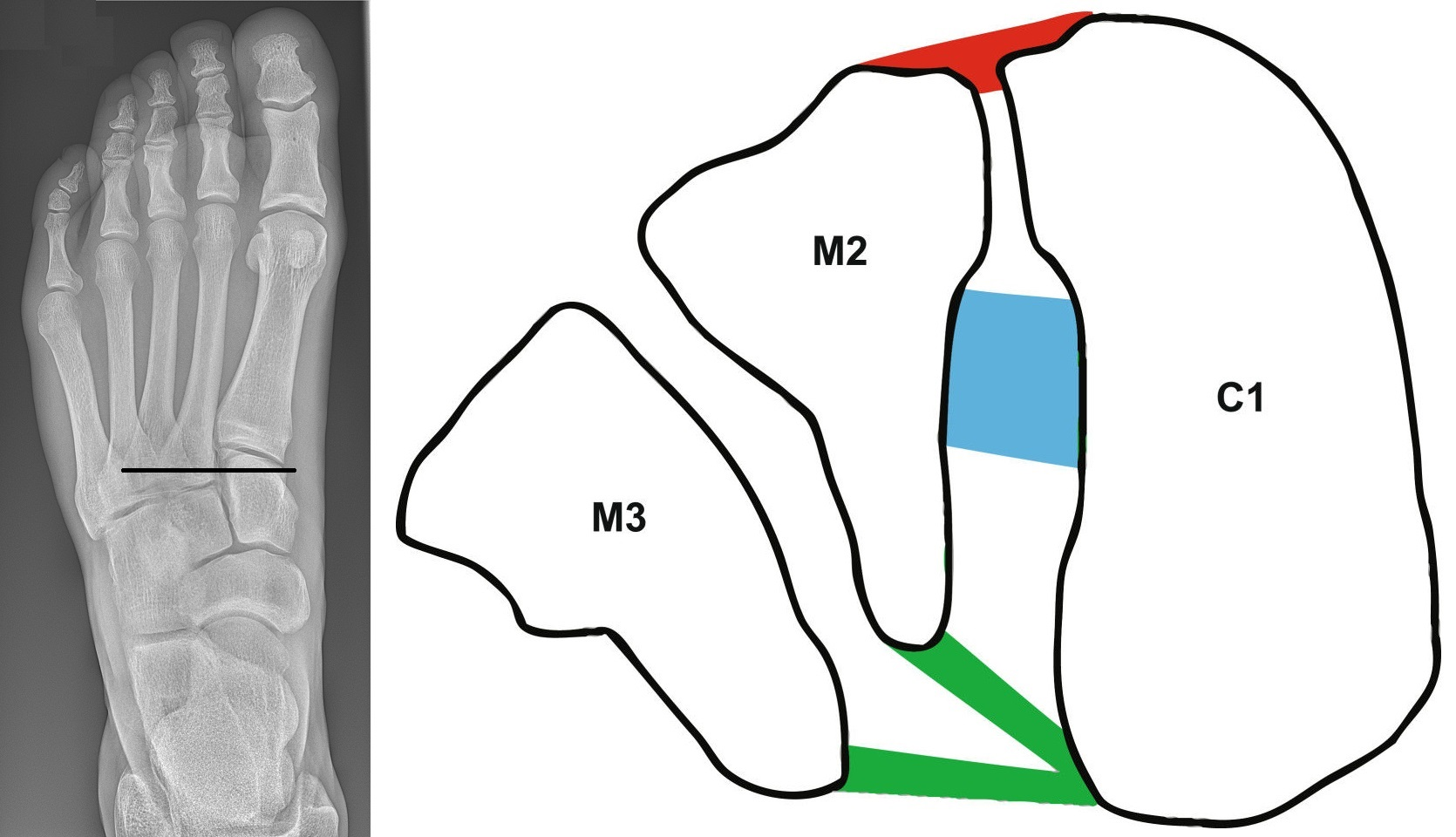
- Lisfranc ligaments: C1 = Medial cuneiform M2 = 2nd metatarsal base M3 = 3rd metatarsal base Red = dorsal Lisfranc ligament Blue = interosseous Lisfranc ligament Green = plantar Lisfranc ligament.

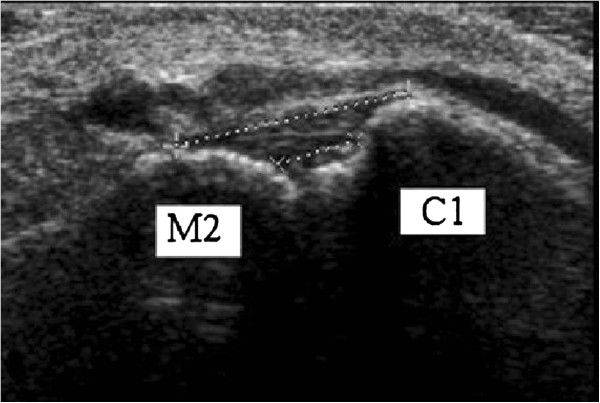
- Ultrasonography of the dorsal Lisfranc ligament.

The Lisfranc ligament is one of several ligaments which connects the medial cuneiform bone to the second metatarsal. Sometimes, the term Lisfranc ligament refers specifically to the ligament that connects the superior, lateral surface of the medial cuneiform to the superior, medial surface of the base of the second metatarsal.

== Structure ==
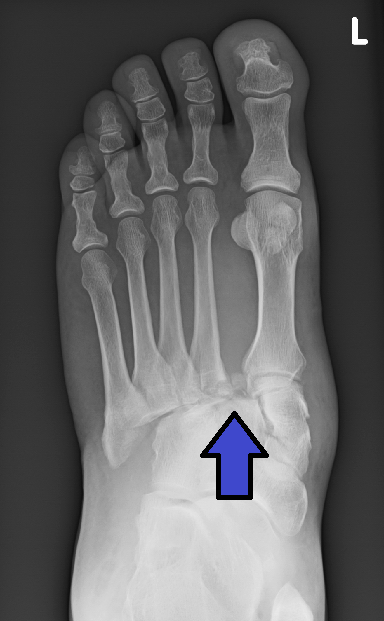
Lisfranc fracture, with an increased distance between the medial cuneiform and the second metatarsal.

The Lisfranc ligament connects the medial cuneiform bone to the second metatarsal. It is a complex of 3 ligaments: the dorsal Lisfranc ligament, the interosseous Lisfranc ligament, and the plantar Lisfranc ligament.

=== Variation ===
In 20% of people, there are two bands of each component of the ligament, usually of the dorsal Lisfranc ligament or the plantar Lisfranc ligament.

== Function ==
The Lisfranc ligament maintains proper alignment between the metatarsal bones and the tarsal bones. It acts as a shock absorber during the weight bearing phase of the bipedal gait cycle. It also compensates for the lack of an intermetatarsal ligament between the first metatarsal bone and the second metatarsal bone.

== Clinical significance ==
The Lisfranc ligament is injured or disrupted in the Lisfranc fracture. Trauma to the midfoot is caused by direct and indirect impact forces. Direct force involves an object landing on the surface on the foot. Indirect force involves twisting of the foot, usually an impact to the heel while the foot is pointed down toward the ground. A mild form of this injury results in a widening of the gap between the first and second metatarsals. An extreme form of the a Lisfranc fracture causes a complete dislocation of the metatarsals from the tarsal bones. When the alignment of the midfoot is affected joint cartilage is quickly damaged.

== History ==
=== Eponym ===
The ligament and the fracture are named after the Napoleonic army surgeon, Jacques Lisfranc de St. Martin.
