= Lisfranc injury =

Type of fracture/dislocation injury of the foot

- Other names: Lisfranc fracture, Lisfranc dislocation, Lisfranc fracture dislocation, tarsometatarsal injury, midfoot injury
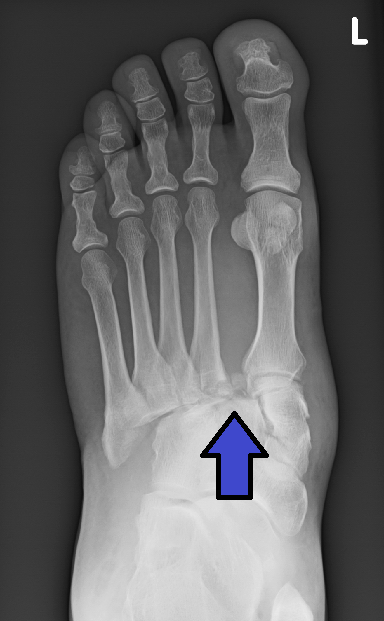
- An X-ray of a Lisfranc injury
- Specialty: Orthopedics

A Lisfranc injury, also known as Lisfranc fracture, is an injury of the foot in which one or more of the metatarsal bones are displaced from the tarsus.

The injury is named after Jacques Lisfranc de St. Martin, a French surgeon and gynecologist who noticed this fracture pattern amongst cavalrymen in 1815, after the War of the Sixth Coalition.

== Causes ==
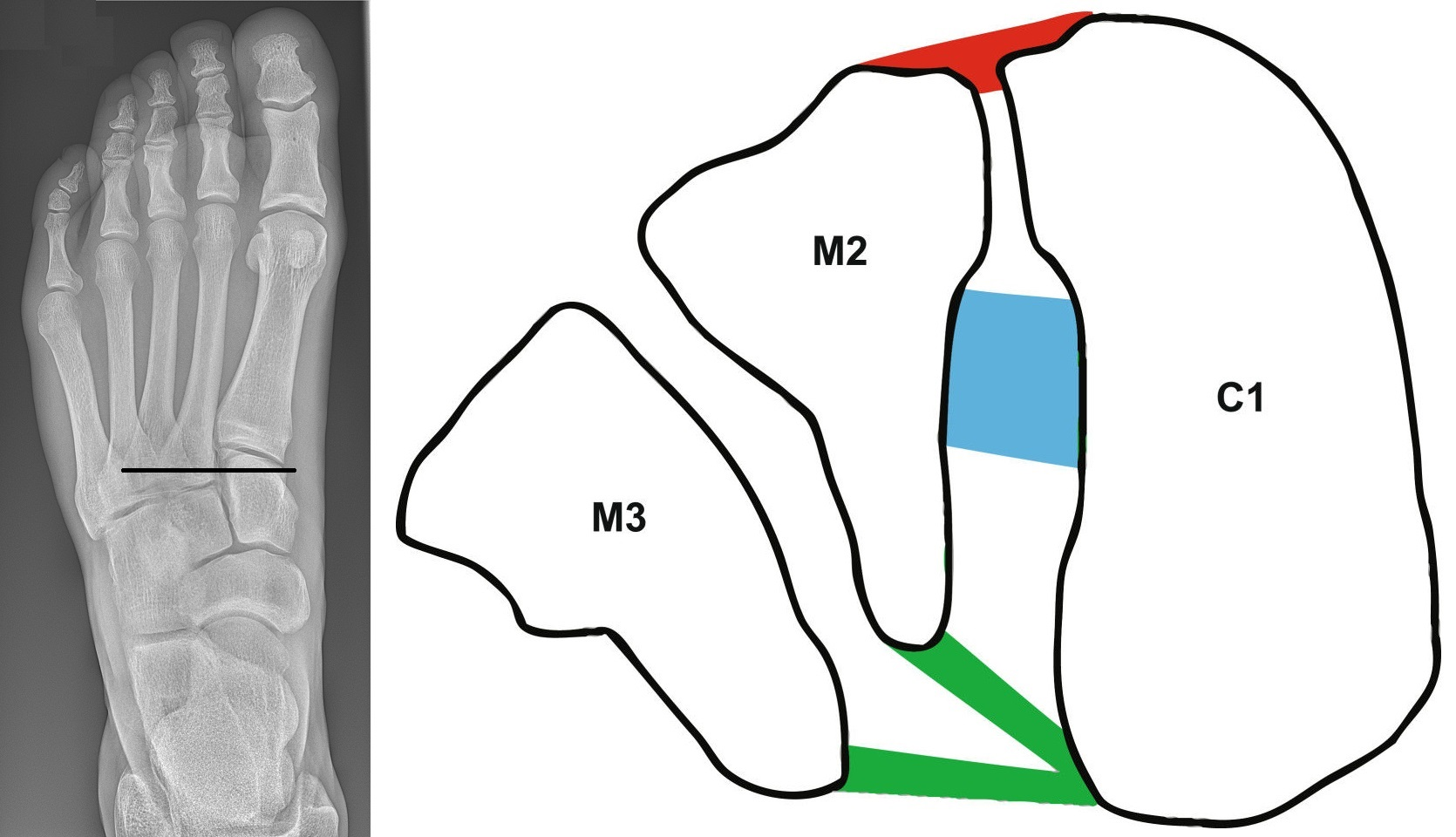
Lisfranc ligaments: C1 = Medial cuneiform M2 = 2nd metatarsal base M3 = 3rd metatarsal base Red = dorsal Lisfranc ligament Blue = interosseous Lisfranc ligament Green = plantar Lisfranc ligament.

The midfoot consists of five bones that form the arches of the foot (the cuboid, navicular, and three cuneiform bones) and their articulations with the bases of the five metatarsal bones. It is these articulations that are damaged in a Lisfranc injury. Such injuries typically involve the ligaments between the medial cuneiform bone and the bases of the second and third metatarsal bones, and each of these ligaments is called Lisfranc ligament.

Lisfranc injuries are caused when excessive kinetic energy is applied either directly or indirectly to the midfoot and are often seen in traffic collisions or industrial accidents.

Direct Lisfranc injuries are usually caused by a crush injury, such as a heavy object falling onto the midfoot, or the foot being run over by a car or truck, or someone landing on the foot after a fall from a significant height. Indirect Lisfranc injuries are caused by a sudden rotational force on a plantar flexed (downward pointing) forefoot. Examples of this type of trauma include a rider falling from a horse but the foot remaining trapped in the stirrup, or a person falling forward after stepping into a storm drain.

In athletic trauma, Lisfranc injuries occur commonly in activities such as windsurfing, kitesurfing, wakeboarding, or snowboarding (where appliance bindings pass directly over the metatarsals). American football players occasionally acquire this injury, and it most often occurs when the athlete's foot is plantar flexed and another player lands on the heel. This can also be seen in pivoting athletic positions such as a baseball catcher or a ballerina spinning.

== Diagnosis ==
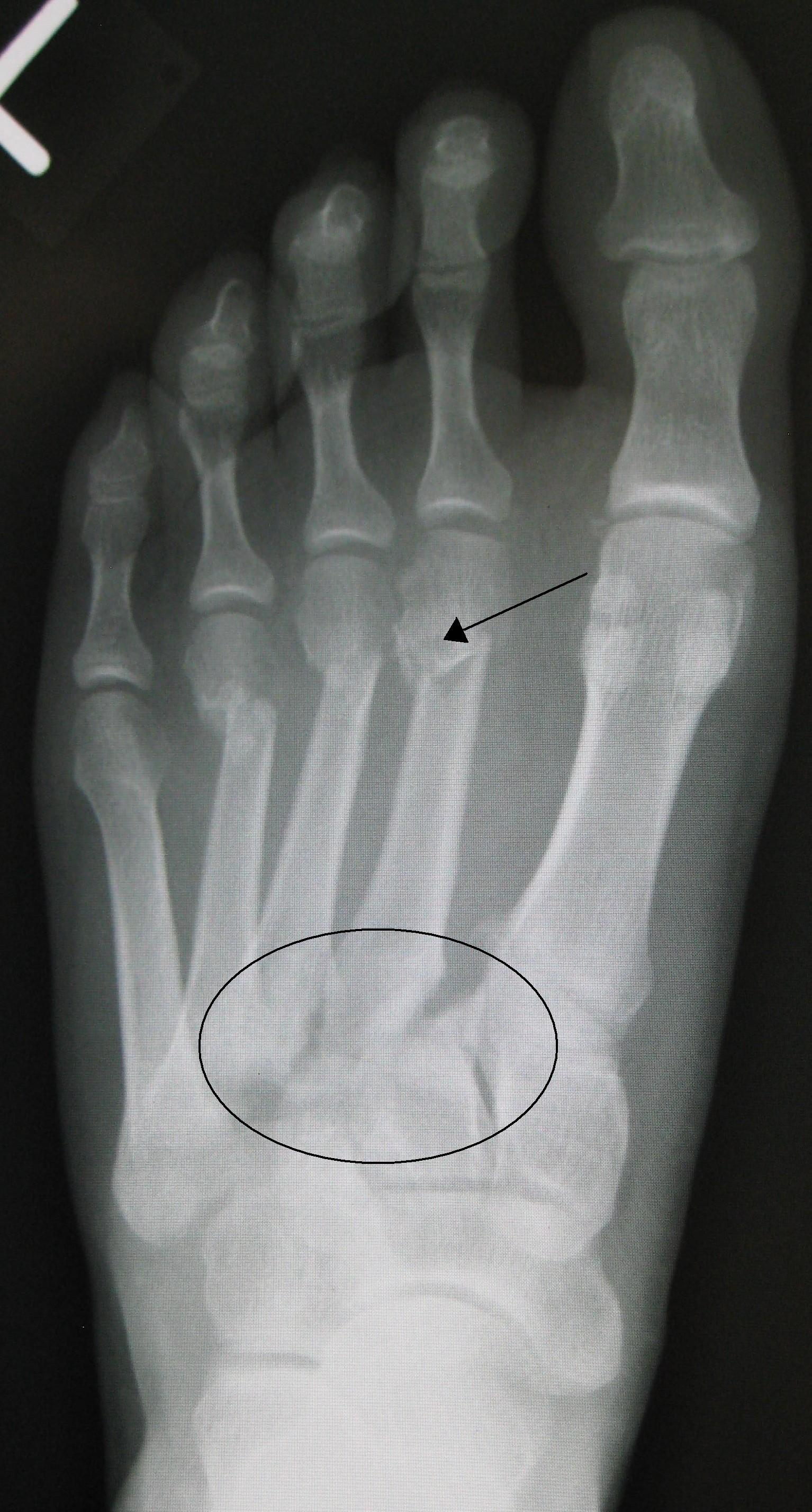
Lisfranc fracture (marked by the oval). This case also has fractures of the distal second (marked by the arrow), third, and fourth metatarsal bones.

In a high energy injury to the midfoot, such as a fall from a height or a motor vehicle accident, the diagnosis of a Lisfranc injury should, in theory at least, pose less of a challenge. There will be deformity of the midfoot and X-ray abnormalities should be obvious. Further, the nature of the injury will create heightened clinical suspicion and there may even be disruption of the overlying skin and compromise of the blood supply. Typical X-ray findings would include a gap between the base of the first and second toes. The diagnosis becomes more challenging in the case of low energy incidents, such as might occur with a twisting injury on the racquetball court, or when an American Football lineman is forced back upon a foot that is already in a fully plantar flexed position. Then, there may only be complaint of inability to bear weight and some mild swelling of the forefoot or midfoot. Bruising of the arch has been described as diagnostic in these circumstances but may well be absent. Typically, conventional radiography of the foot is utilized with standard non-weight bearing views, supplemented by weight-bearing views which may demonstrate widening of the interval between the first and second toes, if the initial views fail to show abnormality. Unfortunately, radiographs in such circumstances have a sensitivity of 50% when non-weight bearing and 85% when weight-bearing, meaning that they will appear normal in 15% of cases where a Lisfranc injury actually exists. In the case of apparently normal x-rays, if clinical suspicion remains, advanced imaging such as magnetic resonance imaging (MRI) or computed tomography (CT scan) is a logical next step.

=== Classification ===
There are three classifications for the fracture:

1. Homolateral: All five metatarsals are displaced in the same direction. Lateral displacement may also suggest cuboidal fracture.
2. Isolated: one or two metatarsals are displaced from the others.
3. Divergent: metatarsals are displaced in a sagittal or coronal plane and may also involve the intercuneiform area and include a navicular fracture.

== Treatment ==
Options include operative or non-operative treatment. One study claims that in athletes, and if the dislocation is less than 2 mm, the fracture can be managed with casting for six weeks. The person's injured limb cannot bear weight during this period. In the majority of cases, early surgical alignment of bone fragments to their original anatomical position (open reduction) and stable fixation is indicated. A 2005 study suggests that closed reduction and Kirschner wire (K-wire) stabilisation or open reduction and stabilisation - generally using screws to avoid the complication of K-wires and maintain a stable reduction - are the treatments of choice.

According to a 1997 study, for severe Lisfranc injuries, open reduction with internal fixation (ORIF) and temporary screw or Kirschner wire fixation is the treatment of choice. The foot cannot be allowed to bear weight for a minimum of six weeks. Partial weight-bearing may then begin, with full weight-bearing after an additional several weeks, depending on the specific injury. K-wires are typically removed after six weeks, before weight-bearing, while screws are often removed after 12 weeks.

When a Lisfranc injury is characterized by significant displacement of the tarsometatarsal joint(s), nonoperative treatment often leads to severe loss of function and long-term disability secondary to chronic pain and sometimes to a planovalgus deformity. In cases with severe pain, loss of function, or progressive deformity that has failed to respond to nonoperative treatment, mid-tarsal and tarsometatarsal arthrodesis (operative fusion of the bones) may be indicated.

Rehabilitation for Lisfranc injuries involves strengthening exercises and mobility training after the initial healing phase. EMS foot massagers have emerged as a supportive therapy to improve muscle activity, reduce stiffness, and enhance blood flow in the affected foot. Their effectiveness depends on correct usage and approval from a healthcare professional.

== History ==
During the Napoleonic Wars, Jacques Lisfranc de St. Martin encountered a soldier who had developed vascular compromise and secondary gangrene of the foot after a fall from a horse. Subsequently, Lisfranc performed an amputation at the level of the tarsometatarsal joints, and that area of the foot has since been referred to as the "Lisfranc joint". Although Lisfranc did not describe a specific mechanism of injury or classification scheme, a Lisfranc injury has come to mean a dislocation or fracture-dislocation injury at the tarsometatarsal joints.

== See also ==
- Bosworth fracture
- Chopart's fracture-dislocation
- Jones fracture
- List of eponymous fractures
- March fracture
