= Jacques Lisfranc de Saint Martin =

French surgeon and gynecologist (1787–1847)

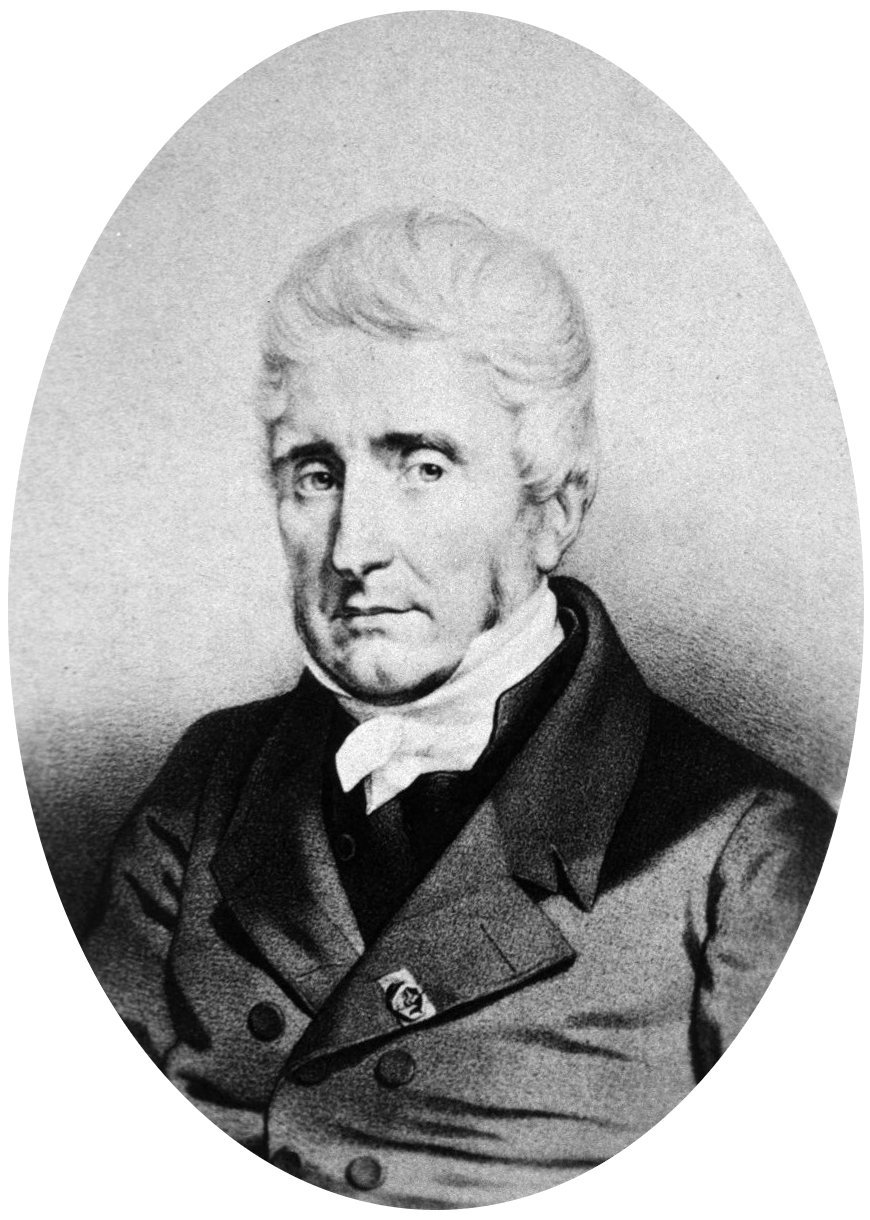
- Born: 12 April 1787; Saint-Paul-en-Jarez, French First Republic
- Died: May 13, 1847 (aged 60)
- Resting place: Cimetière du Montparnasse
- Occupation: Surgeon
- Employer: Hôpital de la Pitié
- Known for: Discovery & namesake of Lisfranc joint and Lisfranc fracture

Jacques Lisfranc de Saint Martin (12 April 1787 – 13 May 1847) was a pioneering French surgeon and gynecologist. He pioneered a number of operations including removal of the rectum, lithotomy in women, and amputation of the cervix uteri.

Born in Saint-Paul-en-Jarez, he studied medicine in Lyon and Paris, where he worked as an assistant to Guillaume Dupuytren. In 1826 he became director of his own department at the Hôpital de la Pitié, from where he gave classes in clinical medicine. The Lisfranc joint and the Lisfranc fracture are named after him.

Lisfranc is buried in the Cimetière du Montparnasse in Paris.

== Selected works ==
- Des diverses méthodes et des différens procédés pour l'oblitération des artères dans le traitement des anévrysmes etc. (Concours-thesis for the chair of Alexis de Boyer), 1834.
- Maladies de l'utérus, d'après les leçons cliniques. Paris 1836. (A book on diseases of the uterus that was prepared by his assistant, Jean Hippolyte Pauly. It includes many case histories from the Hôpital de la Pitié). English translation by G. H. Lodge, Boston, 1839.
- Clinique chirurgicale de l’hôpital de la Pitié. 3 volumes, 1841–1843.

== External links and references ==
- "Biography". whonamedit.com. Archived from the original on February 24, 2003.
