= List of MeSH codes (C05) =

The following is a partial list of the "C" codes for Medical Subject Headings (MeSH), as defined by the United States National Library of Medicine (NLM).

This list continues the information at List of MeSH codes (C04). Codes following these are found at List of MeSH codes (C06). For other MeSH codes, see List of MeSH codes.

The source for this content is the set of 2006 MeSH Trees from the NLM.

== MeSH C05 – musculoskeletal diseases ==
=== MeSH C05.116 – bone diseases ===
==== MeSH C05.116.070 – bone cysts ====
- MeSH C05.116.070.265 – bone cysts, aneurysmal

==== MeSH C05.116.099 – bone diseases, developmental ====
- MeSH C05.116.099.052 – acro-osteolysis
- MeSH C05.116.099.052.400 – Hajdu–Cheney syndrome
- MeSH C05.116.099.105 – basal-cell nevus syndrome
- MeSH C05.116.099.343 – dwarfism
- MeSH C05.116.099.343.110 – achondroplasia
- MeSH C05.116.099.343.250 – cockayne syndrome
- MeSH C05.116.099.343.347 – congenital hypothyroidism
- MeSH C05.116.099.343.445 – dwarfism, pituitary
- MeSH C05.116.099.343.679 – Laron syndrome
- MeSH C05.116.099.343.796 – Mulibrey nanism
- MeSH C05.116.099.343.914 – thanatophoric dysplasia
- MeSH C05.116.099.370 – dysostoses
- MeSH C05.116.099.370.231 – craniofacial dysostosis
- MeSH C05.116.099.370.231.427 – Hallermann's syndrome
- MeSH C05.116.099.370.231.480 – hypertelorism
- MeSH C05.116.099.370.231.576 – mandibulofacial dysostosis
- MeSH C05.116.099.370.231.576.410 – goldenhar syndrome
- MeSH C05.116.099.370.380 – focal dermal hypoplasia
- MeSH C05.116.099.370.535 – Klippel–Feil syndrome
- MeSH C05.116.099.370.652 – orofaciodigital syndromes
- MeSH C05.116.099.370.797 – Rubinstein–Taybi syndrome
- MeSH C05.116.099.370.894 – synostosis
- MeSH C05.116.099.370.894.232 – craniosynostoses
- MeSH C05.116.099.370.894.232.015 – acrocephalosyndactylia
- MeSH C05.116.099.370.894.819 – syndactyly
- MeSH C05.116.099.370.894.819.100 – acrocephalosyndactylia
- MeSH C05.116.099.370.894.819.756 – Poland syndrome
- MeSH C05.116.099.386 – funnel chest
- MeSH C05.116.099.492 – gigantism
- MeSH C05.116.099.655 – leg length inequality
- MeSH C05.116.099.674 – Marfan syndrome
- MeSH C05.116.099.708 – osteochondrodysplasias
- MeSH C05.116.099.708.017 – achondroplasia
- MeSH C05.116.099.708.195 – chondrodysplasia punctata
- MeSH C05.116.099.708.195.200 – chondrodysplasia punctata, rhizomelic
- MeSH C05.116.099.708.207 – cleidocranial dysplasia
- MeSH C05.116.099.708.281 – diaphyseal dysplasia, progressive
- MeSH C05.116.099.708.327 – Ellis–van Creveld syndrome
- MeSH C05.116.099.708.338 – enchondromatosis
- MeSH C05.116.099.708.375 – fibrous dysplasia of bone
- MeSH C05.116.099.708.375.199 – cherubism
- MeSH C05.116.099.708.375.372 – fibrous dysplasia, monostotic
- MeSH C05.116.099.708.375.381 – fibrous dysplasia, polyostotic
- MeSH C05.116.099.708.479 – hyperostosis, cortical, congenital
- MeSH C05.116.099.708.486 – hyperostosis frontalis interna
- MeSH C05.116.099.708.582 – Langer–Giedion syndrome
- MeSH C05.116.099.708.670 – osteochondroma
- MeSH C05.116.099.708.670.615 – osteochondromatosis
- MeSH C05.116.099.708.670.615.325 – exostoses, multiple hereditary
- MeSH C05.116.099.708.685 – osteogenesis imperfecta
- MeSH C05.116.099.708.702 – osteosclerosis
- MeSH C05.116.099.708.702.593 – melorheostosis
- MeSH C05.116.099.708.702.678 – osteopetrosis
- MeSH C05.116.099.708.702.685 – osteopoikilosis
- MeSH C05.116.099.708.800 – acquired hyperostosis syndrome
- MeSH C05.116.099.708.857 – short rib–polydactyly syndrome
- MeSH C05.116.099.708.914 – thanatophoric dysplasia
- MeSH C05.116.099.736 – osteolysis, essential
- MeSH C05.116.099.742 – platybasia
- MeSH C05.116.099.750 – Proteus syndrome

==== MeSH C05.116.132 – bone diseases, endocrine ====
- MeSH C05.116.132.082 – acromegaly
- MeSH C05.116.132.256 – congenital hypothyroidism
- MeSH C05.116.132.358 – dwarfism, pituitary
- MeSH C05.116.132.479 – gigantism
- MeSH C05.116.132.684 – osteitis fibrosa cystica

==== MeSH C05.116.165 – bone diseases, infectious ====
- MeSH C05.116.165.412 – osteitis
- MeSH C05.116.165.495 – osteomyelitis
- MeSH C05.116.165.595 – periostitis
- MeSH C05.116.165.762 – spondylitis
- MeSH C05.116.165.762.301 – discitis
- MeSH C05.116.165.886 – tuberculosis, osteoarticular
- MeSH C05.116.165.886.722 – tuberculosis, spinal

==== MeSH C05.116.198 – bone diseases, metabolic ====
- MeSH C05.116.198.247 – bone demineralization, pathologic
- MeSH C05.116.198.247.400 – decalcification, pathologic
- MeSH C05.116.198.371 – mucolipidoses
- MeSH C05.116.198.495 – osteomalacia
- MeSH C05.116.198.579 – osteoporosis
- MeSH C05.116.198.579.610 – osteoporosis, postmenopausal
- MeSH C05.116.198.709 – pseudohypoparathyroidism
- MeSH C05.116.198.709.628 – pseudopseudohypoparathyroidism
- MeSH C05.116.198.762 – renal osteodystrophy
- MeSH C05.116.198.816 – rickets

==== MeSH C05.116.231 – bone neoplasms ====
- MeSH C05.116.231.030 – adamantinoma
- MeSH C05.116.231.343 – femoral neoplasms
- MeSH C05.116.231.754 – skull neoplasms
- MeSH C05.116.231.754.450 – jaw neoplasms
- MeSH C05.116.231.754.450.583 – mandibular neoplasms
- MeSH C05.116.231.754.450.601 – maxillary neoplasms
- MeSH C05.116.231.754.450.692 – palatal neoplasms
- MeSH C05.116.231.754.600 – nose neoplasms
- MeSH C05.116.231.754.659 – orbital neoplasms
- MeSH C05.116.231.754.829 – skull base neoplasms
- MeSH C05.116.231.828 – spinal neoplasms

==== MeSH C05.116.264 – bone resorption ====
- MeSH C05.116.264.143 – ainhum
- MeSH C05.116.264.150 – alveolar bone loss
- MeSH C05.116.264.579 – osteolysis
- MeSH C05.116.264.579.052 – acro-osteolysis
- MeSH C05.116.264.579.052.400 – Hajdu–Cheney syndrome
- MeSH C05.116.264.579.704 – osteolysis, essential

==== MeSH C05.116.540 – hyperostosis ====
- MeSH C05.116.540.310 – exostoses
- MeSH C05.116.540.310.500 – exostoses, multiple hereditary
- MeSH C05.116.540.310.600 – heel spur
- MeSH C05.116.540.400 – hyperostosis, cortical, congenital
- MeSH C05.116.540.410 – hyperostosis, diffuse idiopathic skeletal
- MeSH C05.116.540.420 – hyperostosis frontalis interna
- MeSH C05.116.540.600 – hyperostosis, sternocostoclavicular

==== MeSH C05.116.791 – osteochondritis ====
- MeSH C05.116.791.668 – osteochondritis dissecans
- MeSH C05.116.791.835 – scheuermann's disease

==== MeSH C05.116.852 – osteonecrosis ====
- MeSH C05.116.852.175 – femur head necrosis
- MeSH C05.116.852.175.570 – Legg–Perthes disease

==== MeSH C05.116.900 – spinal diseases ====
- MeSH C05.116.900.307 – intervertebral disc displacement
- MeSH C05.116.900.480 – ossification of posterior longitudinal ligament
- MeSH C05.116.900.540 – platybasia
- MeSH C05.116.900.653 – scheuermann's disease
- MeSH C05.116.900.800 – spinal curvatures
- MeSH C05.116.900.800.500 – kyphosis
- MeSH C05.116.900.800.750 – lordosis
- MeSH C05.116.900.800.875 – scoliosis
- MeSH C05.116.900.801 – spinal neoplasms
- MeSH C05.116.900.802 – spinal osteophytosis
- MeSH C05.116.900.802.651 – hyperostosis, diffuse idiopathic skeletal
- MeSH C05.116.900.805 – spinal stenosis
- MeSH C05.116.900.845 – spondylarthritis
- MeSH C05.116.900.845.800 – spondylarthropathies
- MeSH C05.116.900.845.800.145 – arthritis, psoriatic
- MeSH C05.116.900.853.625.800.637 – reactive arthritis
- MeSH C05.116.900.845.800.850 – spondylitis, ankylosing
- MeSH C05.116.900.853 – spondylitis
- MeSH C05.116.900.853.500 – discitis
- MeSH C05.116.900.853.750 – spondylitis, ankylosing
- MeSH C05.116.900.853.850 – tuberculosis, spinal
- MeSH C05.116.900.877 – spondylolisthesis
- MeSH C05.116.900.877.500 – spondylolysis

=== MeSH C05.330 – foot deformities ===
==== MeSH C05.330.488 – foot deformities, acquired ====
- MeSH C05.330.488.099 – bunion, tailor's
- MeSH C05.330.488.200 – equinus deformity
- MeSH C05.330.488.300 – hallux limitus
- MeSH C05.330.488.310 – hallux rigidus

==== MeSH C05.330.495 – foot deformities, congenital ====
- MeSH C05.330.495.150 – clubfoot

=== MeSH C05.500 – jaw diseases ===
==== MeSH C05.500.460 – jaw abnormalities ====
- MeSH C05.500.460.185 – cleft palate
- MeSH C05.500.460.457 – micrognathism
- MeSH C05.500.460.606 – Pierre Robin syndrome
- MeSH C05.500.460.655 – prognathism
- MeSH C05.500.460.813 – retrognathism

==== MeSH C05.500.470 – jaw cysts ====
- MeSH C05.500.470.660 – nonodontogenic cysts
- MeSH C05.500.470.690 – odontogenic cysts
- MeSH C05.500.470.690.150 – basal cell nevus syndrome
- MeSH C05.500.470.690.310 – dentigerous cyst
- MeSH C05.500.470.690.605 – odontogenic cyst, calcifying
- MeSH C05.500.470.690.790 – periodontal cyst
- MeSH C05.500.470.690.790.820 – radicular cyst

==== MeSH C05.500.480 – jaw, edentulous ====
- MeSH C05.500.480.450 – jaw, edentulous, partially

==== MeSH C05.500.499 – jaw neoplasms ====
- MeSH C05.500.499.583 – mandibular neoplasms
- MeSH C05.500.499.601 – maxillary neoplasms
- MeSH C05.500.499.692 – palatal neoplasms

==== MeSH C05.500.607 – mandibular diseases ====
- MeSH C05.500.607.221 – craniomandibular disorders
- MeSH C05.500.607.221.897 – temporomandibular joint disorders
- MeSH C05.500.607.221.897.897 – temporomandibular joint dysfunction syndrome
- MeSH C05.500.607.442 – mandibular neoplasms
- MeSH C05.500.607.655 – prognathism
- MeSH C05.500.607.813 – retrognathism

==== MeSH C05.500.693 – maxillary diseases ====
- MeSH C05.500.693.528 – maxillary neoplasms

=== MeSH C05.550 – joint diseases ===
==== MeSH C05.550.069 – ankylosis ====
- MeSH C05.550.069.680 – spondylitis, ankylosing

==== MeSH C05.550.091 – arthralgia ====
- MeSH C05.550.091.700 – shoulder pain

==== MeSH C05.550.114 – arthritis ====
- MeSH C05.550.114.015 – arthritis, experimental
- MeSH C05.550.114.099 – arthritis, infectious
- MeSH C05.550.114.099.500 – arthritis, reactive
- MeSH C05.550.114.145 – arthritis, psoriatic
- MeSH C05.550.114.154 – arthritis, rheumatoid
- MeSH C05.550.114.154.114 – arthritis, juvenile rheumatoid
- MeSH C05.550.114.154.219 – Caplan's syndrome
- MeSH C05.550.114.154.389 – Felty's syndrome
- MeSH C05.550.114.154.683 – rheumatoid nodule
- MeSH C05.550.114.154.774 – Sjögren syndrome
- MeSH C05.550.114.154.856 – spondylitis, ankylosing
- MeSH C05.550.114.154.870 – Still's disease, adult-onset
- MeSH C05.550.114.264 – chondrocalcinosis
- MeSH C05.550.114.423 – gout
- MeSH C05.550.114.423.410 – arthritis, gouty
- MeSH C05.550.114.606 – osteoarthritis
- MeSH C05.550.114.606.400 – osteoarthritis, hip
- MeSH C05.550.114.606.500 – osteoarthritis, knee
- MeSH C05.550.114.606.761 – spinal osteophytosis
- MeSH C05.550.114.678 – periarthritis
- MeSH C05.550.114.865.800.637 – reactive arthritis
- MeSH C05.550.114.843 – rheumatic fever
- MeSH C05.550.114.843.566 – rheumatic nodule
- MeSH C05.550.114.843.823 – Wissler's syndrome
- MeSH C05.550.114.865 – spondylarthritis
- MeSH C05.550.114.865.800 – spondylarthropathies
- MeSH C05.550.114.865.800.145 – arthritis, psoriatic
- MeSH C05.550.114.865.800.150 – arthritis, reactive
- MeSH C05.550.114.865.800.782 – Reiter disease
- MeSH C05.550.114.865.800.850 – spondylitis, ankylosing

==== MeSH C05.550.251 – bursitis ====
- MeSH C05.550.251.595 – periarthritis

==== MeSH C05.550.323 – contracture ====
- MeSH C05.550.323.468 – hip contracture

==== MeSH C05.550.870 – synovitis ====
- MeSH C05.550.870.890 – synovitis, pigmented villonodular

==== MeSH C05.550.905 – temporomandibular joint disorders ====
- MeSH C05.550.905.905 – temporomandibular joint dysfunction syndrome

=== MeSH C05.651 – muscular diseases ===
==== MeSH C05.651.180 – compartment syndromes ====
- MeSH C05.651.180.063 – anterior compartment syndrome

==== MeSH C05.651.197 – contracture ====
- MeSH C05.651.197.270 – Dupuytren's contracture
- MeSH C05.651.197.468 – hip contracture

==== MeSH C05.651.243 – craniomandibular disorders ====
- MeSH C05.651.243.897 – temporomandibular joint disorders
- MeSH C05.651.243.897.897 – temporomandibular joint dysfunction syndrome

==== MeSH C05.651.460 – mitochondrial myopathies ====
- MeSH C05.651.460.620 – mitochondrial encephalomyopathies
- MeSH C05.651.460.620.520 – MELAS syndrome
- MeSH C05.651.460.620.530 – MERRF syndrome
- MeSH C05.651.460.700 – ophthalmoplegia, chronic progressive external
- MeSH C05.651.460.700.500 – Kearns–Sayre syndrome

==== MeSH C05.651.534 – muscular disorders, atrophic ====
- MeSH C05.651.534.500 – muscular dystrophies
- MeSH C05.651.534.500.074 – distal myopathies
- MeSH C05.651.534.500.149 – glycogen storage disease type vii
- MeSH C05.651.534.500.280 – muscular dystrophies, limb-girdle
- MeSH C05.651.534.500.300 – muscular dystrophy, duchenne
- MeSH C05.651.534.500.350 – muscular dystrophy, emery-dreifuss
- MeSH C05.651.534.500.400 – muscular dystrophy, facioscapulohumeral
- MeSH C05.651.534.500.450 – muscular dystrophy, oculopharyngeal
- MeSH C05.651.534.500.500 – myotonic dystrophy
- MeSH C05.651.534.750 – postpoliomyelitis syndrome

==== MeSH C05.651.550 – myofascial pain syndromes ====
- MeSH C05.651.550.905 – temporomandibular joint dysfunction syndrome

==== MeSH C05.651.575 – myopathies, structural, congenital ====
- MeSH C05.651.575.290 – myopathies, nemaline
- MeSH C05.651.575.300 – myopathy, central core

==== MeSH C05.651.594 – myositis ====
- MeSH C05.651.594.297 – dermatomyositis
- MeSH C05.651.594.600 – myositis, inclusion body
- MeSH C05.651.594.638 – myositis ossificans
- MeSH C05.651.594.819 – polymyositis
- MeSH C05.651.594.819.500 – dermatomyositis

==== MeSH C05.651.662 – myotonic disorders ====
- MeSH C05.651.662.500 – myotonia congenita
- MeSH C05.651.662.750 – myotonic dystrophy

==== MeSH C05.651.701 – paralyses, familial periodic ====
- MeSH C05.651.701.450 – hypokalemic periodic paralysis
- MeSH C05.651.701.600 – paralysis, hyperkalemic periodic

==== MeSH C05.651.807 – rhabdomyolysis ====
- MeSH C05.651.807.628 – myoglobinuria

==== MeSH C05.651.869 – tendinopathy ====
- MeSH C05.651.869.870 – tenosynovitis

=== MeSH C05.660 – musculoskeletal abnormalities ===
==== MeSH C05.660.207 – craniofacial abnormalities ====
- MeSH C05.660.207.207 – cleidocranial dysplasia
- MeSH C05.660.207.231 – craniofacial dysostosis
- MeSH C05.660.207.231.427 – Hallermann's syndrome
- MeSH C05.660.207.231.480 – hypertelorism
- MeSH C05.660.207.231.576 – mandibulofacial dysostosis
- MeSH C05.660.207.231.576.410 – Goldenhar syndrome
- MeSH C05.660.207.240 – craniosynostoses
- MeSH C05.660.207.240.100 – acrocephalosyndactylia
- MeSH C05.660.207.410 – holoprosencephaly
- MeSH C05.660.207.525 – leopard syndrome
- MeSH C05.660.207.540 – maxillofacial abnormalities
- MeSH C05.660.207.540.460 – jaw abnormalities
- MeSH C05.660.207.540.460.185 – cleft palate
- MeSH C05.660.207.540.460.457 – micrognathism
- MeSH C05.660.207.540.460.606 – Pierre Robin syndrome
- MeSH C05.660.207.540.460.655 – prognathism
- MeSH C05.660.207.540.460.813 – retrognathism
- MeSH C05.660.207.620 – microcephaly
- MeSH C05.660.207.690 – Noonan syndrome
- MeSH C05.660.207.700 – orofaciodigital syndromes
- MeSH C05.660.207.715 – plagiocephaly, nonsynostotic
- MeSH C05.660.207.720 – platybasia
- MeSH C05.660.207.850 – Rubinstein–Taybi syndrome

==== MeSH C05.660.585 – limb deformities, congenital ====
- MeSH C05.660.585.350 – ectromelia
- MeSH C05.660.585.512 – lower extremity deformities, congenital
- MeSH C05.660.585.512.380 – foot deformities, congenital
- MeSH C05.660.585.600 – polydactyly
- MeSH C05.660.585.600.750 – short rib-polydactyly syndrome
- MeSH C05.660.585.620 – proteus syndrome
- MeSH C05.660.585.800 – syndactyly
- MeSH C05.660.585.800.100 – acrocephalosyndactylia
- MeSH C05.660.585.800.756 – poland syndrome
- MeSH C05.660.585.984 – thanatophoric dysplasia
- MeSH C05.660.585.988 – upper extremity deformities, congenital
- MeSH C05.660.585.988.425 – hand deformities, congenital

==== MeSH C05.660.906 – synostosis ====
- MeSH C05.660.906.364 – craniosynostoses
- MeSH C05.660.906.364.100 – acrocephalosyndactylia
- MeSH C05.660.906.819 – syndactyly
- MeSH C05.660.906.819.100 – acrocephalosyndactylia
- MeSH C05.660.906.819.756 – poland syndrome

=== MeSH C05.799 – rheumatic diseases ===
==== MeSH C05.799.114 – arthritis, rheumatoid ====
- MeSH C05.799.114.114 – arthritis, juvenile rheumatoid
- MeSH C05.799.114.219 – Caplan's syndrome
- MeSH C05.799.114.389 – Felty's syndrome
- MeSH C05.799.114.683 – rheumatoid nodule
- MeSH C05.799.114.774 – Sjögren syndrome
- MeSH C05.799.114.856 – spondylitis, ankylosing
- MeSH C05.799.114.870 – Still's disease, adult-onset

==== MeSH C05.799.414 – gout ====
- MeSH C05.799.414.410 – arthritis, gouty

==== MeSH C05.799.613 – osteoarthritis ====
- MeSH C05.799.613.400 – osteoarthritis, hip
- MeSH C05.799.613.500 – osteoarthritis, knee
- MeSH C05.799.613.678 – spinal osteophytosis

==== MeSH C05.799.825 – rheumatic fever ====
- MeSH C05.799.825.566 – rheumatic nodule
- MeSH C05.799.825.823 – Wissler's syndrome

=== MeSH C05.906 – tennis elbow ===
The list continues at List of MeSH codes (C06).
