= Morgagni–Stewart–Morel syndrome =

- Other names: Hyperostosis frontalis interna,' Metabolic craniopathy
- Morgagni–Stewart–Morel syndrome is inherited in an X-linked recessive manner (or autosomal dominant).
- Specialty: Endocrinology

Morgagni–Stewart–Morel syndrome is a condition with a wide range of associated endocrine problems including: diabetes mellitus, diabetes insipidus, and hyperparathyroidism. Other signs and symptoms include headaches, vertigo, hirsutism, menstrual disorder, galactorrhoea, obesity, depression, and seizures. It is characterized by a thickening of the inner table of the frontal part of the skull, a usually benign condition known as hyperostosis frontalis interna. The syndrome was first described in 1765. It is named after the Italian anatomist and pathologist Giovanni Battista Morgagni, the British neurologist Roy Mackenzie Stewart, and the Swiss psychiatrist Ferdinand Morel.

== Diagnosis ==
The diagnosis of Morgagni–Stewart–Morel is based upon a radiological finding of hyperostosis frontalis interna. Diagnosis considers a combination of clinical features including obesity, virilism, and mental disturbances.

== Treatment ==
Treatment is based upon the symptoms, and generally includes medication, diet and lifestyle modification for weight control. Seizures and headaches associated with hyperostosis frontalis interna (HFI) are treated with standard medications.
