= Roy Stuart =

Roy Stuart or Roy Stewart may refer to:

- Roy Stuart (actor)
- Roy Stuart (photographer)
- Roy Stuart (American football)
- Roy Stewart, actor and stuntman
- Roy Stewart (silent film actor)
- Roy Stewart (American football)
- Roy Mackenzie Stewart, Scottish neurologist
- General Roy Stewart, a fictional character in the TV series Arrow
