= Foot =

Anatomical structure found in vertebrates

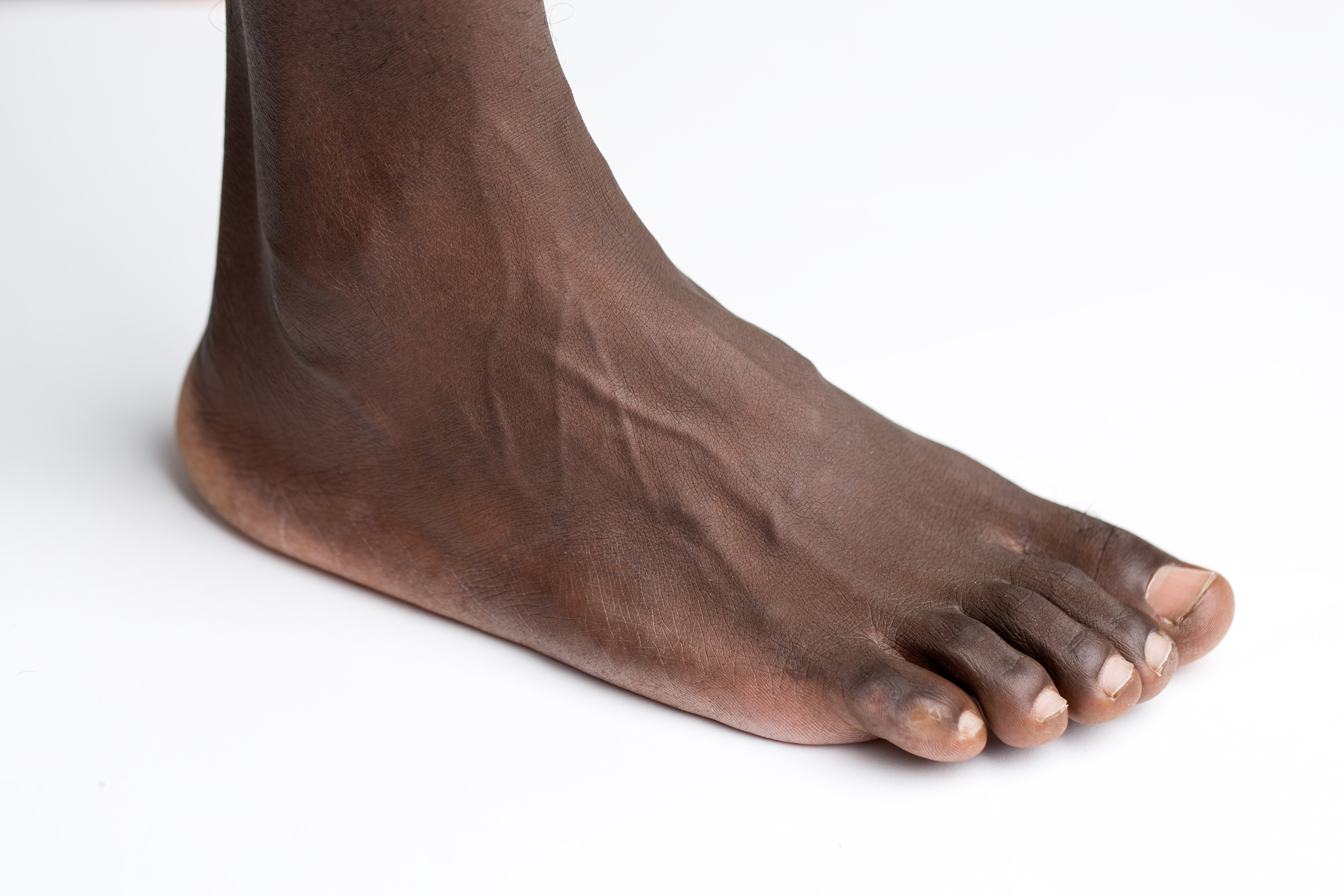

Details
- Artery: Dorsalis pedis, medial plantar, lateral plantar
- Nerve: Medial plantar, lateral plantar, deep fibular, superficial fibular

Identifiers
- Latin: pes
- Greek: πούς (poús)
- MeSH: D005528
- TA98: A01.1.00.040
- TA2: 166
- FMA: 9664

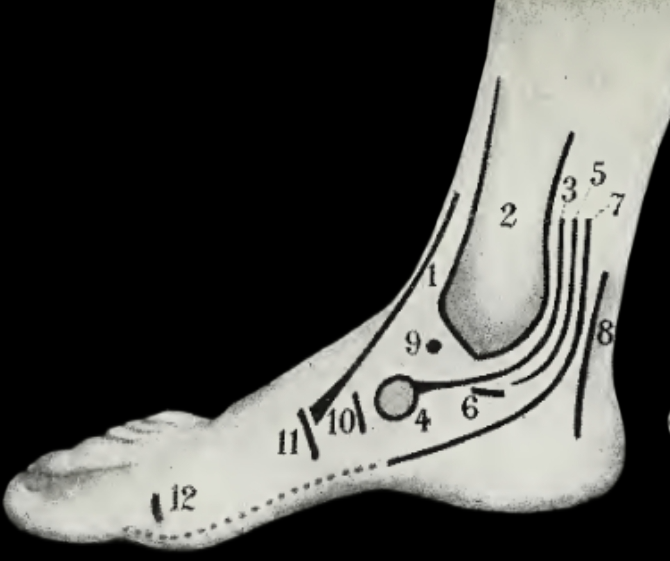
Surface anatomy of the right foot and ankle; medial aspect. 1, tibialis anterior tendon — 2, medial malleolus — 3, tibialis posterior tendon — 4, navicular tuberosity — 5, flexor digitorum longus tendon — 6, sustentaculum tali of calcaneus — 7, flexor hallucis longus tendon — 8, Achilles tendon — 9, head of talus — 10, joint between navicular and first cuneiform — 11, joint between first metatarsal and first cuneiform — 12, metatarso-phalangeal joint. (After Rawlings.)

The foot (pl.: feet) is an anatomical structure found in many vertebrates. It is the terminal portion of a limb which bears weight and allows locomotion. In many animals with feet, the foot is an organ at the terminal part of the leg made up of one or more segments or bones, generally including claws and/or nails.

== Etymology ==
The word "foot", in the sense of meaning the "terminal part of the leg of a vertebrate animal" comes from Old English fot, from Proto-Germanic *fot (which is also the source of Old Frisian fot, Old Saxon fot, Old Norse fotr, Danish fod, Swedish fot, Dutch voet, Old High German fuoz, German Fuß, Gothic fotus; all meaning "foot"), from Proto-Indo-European root *ped- "foot".

The plural form feet is an instance of i-mutation. Secondary plural forms such as feets, feeten, and feetses are attested in modern English, especially in regional, non-standard usage.

== Structure ==
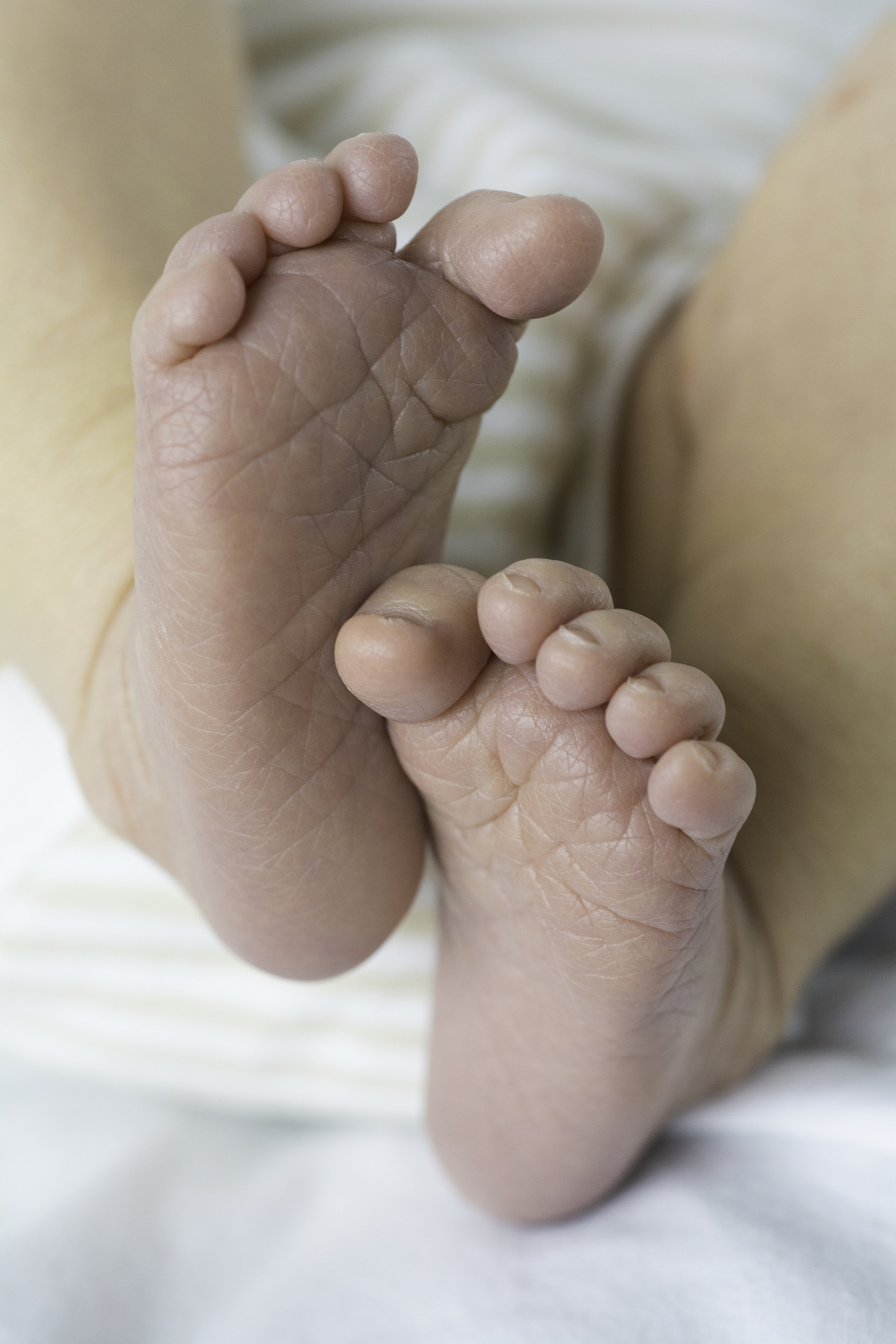
The feet of a newborn infant

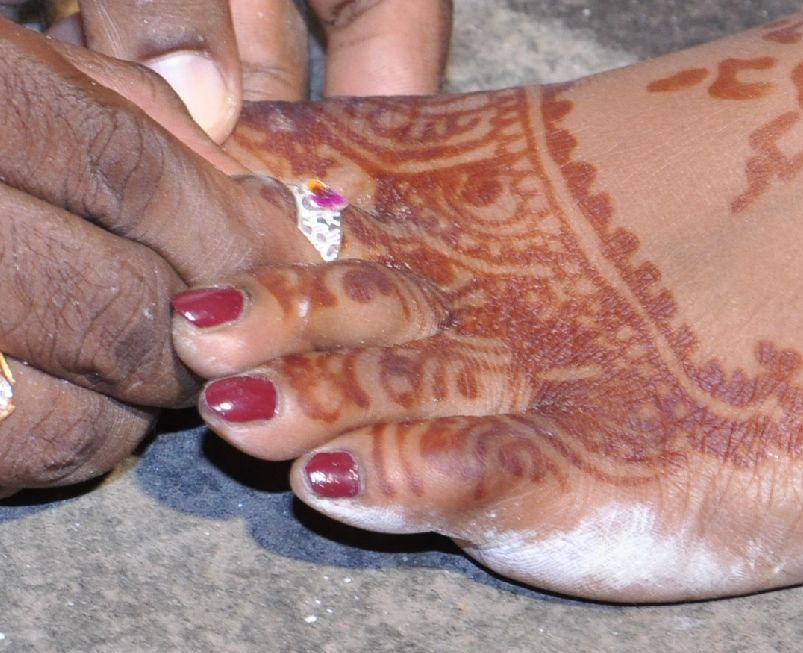
A woman's foot, decorated with nail polish and henna, and wearing a metti (toe ring) on the second toe, for her wedding

The human foot is a strong and complex mechanical structure containing 26 bones, 33 joints (20 of which are actively articulated), and more than one hundred muscles, tendons, and ligaments. The joints of the foot are the ankle and subtalar joint and the interphalangeal joints of the foot. An anthropometric study of 1197 North American adult Caucasian males (mean age 35.5 years) found that a man's foot length was 26.3 cm with a standard deviation of 1.2 cm.

The foot can be subdivided into the hindfoot, the midfoot, and the forefoot:

The hindfoot is composed of the talus (or ankle bone) and the calcaneus (or heel bone). The two long bones of the lower leg, the tibia and fibula, are connected to the top of the talus to form the ankle. Connected to the talus at the subtalar joint, the calcaneus, the largest bone of the foot, is cushioned underneath by a layer of fat.

The five irregular bones of the midfoot, the cuboid, navicular, and three cuneiform bones, form the arches of the foot which serve as a shock absorber. The midfoot is connected to the hind- and fore-foot by muscles and the plantar fascia.

The forefoot is composed of five toes and the corresponding five proximal long bones forming the metatarsus. Similar to the fingers of the hand, the bones of the toes are called phalanges and the big toe has two phalanges while the other four toes have three phalanges each. The joints between the phalanges are called interphalangeal and those between the metatarsus and phalanges are called metatarsophalangeal (MTP).

Both the midfoot and forefoot constitute the dorsum (the area facing upward while standing) and the planum (the area facing downward while standing).

The instep is the arched part of the top of the foot between the toes and the ankle.

=== Bones ===
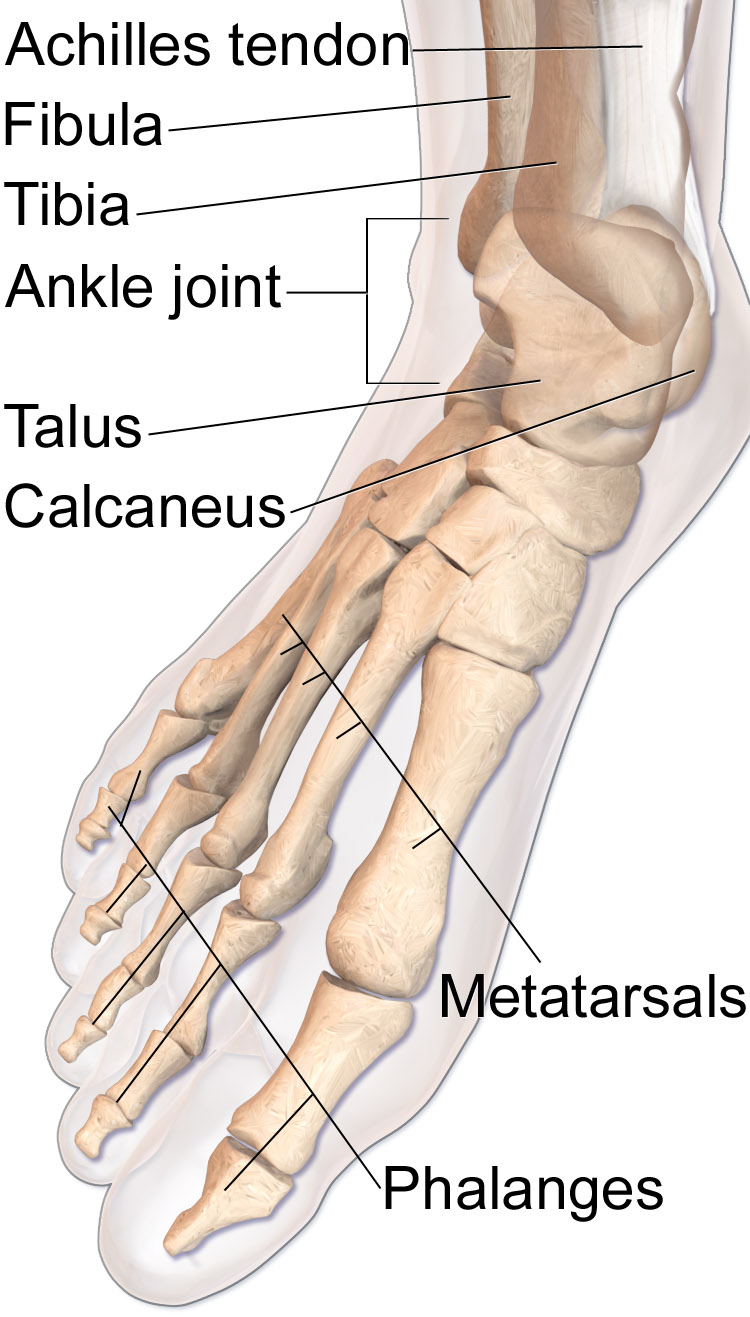
Illustration of bones in lower leg and foot

Foot bone anatomy

- tibia, fibula
- tarsus (7): talus, calcaneus, cuneiformes (3), cuboid, and navicular
- metatarsus (5): first, second, third, fourth, and fifth metatarsal bone
- phalanges (14)

There can be many sesamoid bones near the metatarsophalangeal joints, although they are only regularly present in the distal portion of the first metatarsal bone.

=== Arches ===
The human foot has two longitudinal arches and a transverse arch maintained by the interlocking shapes of the foot bones, strong ligaments, and pulling muscles during activity. The slight mobility of these arches when weight is applied to and removed from the foot makes walking and running more economical in terms of energy. As can be examined in a footprint, the medial longitudinal arch curves above the ground. This arch stretches from the heel bone over the "keystone" ankle bone to the three medial metatarsals. In contrast, the lateral longitudinal arch is very low. With the cuboid serving as its keystone, it redistributes part of the weight to the calcaneus and the distal end of the fifth metatarsal. The two longitudinal arches serve as pillars for the transverse arch which run obliquely across the tarsometatarsal joints. Excessive strain on the tendons and ligaments of the feet can result in fallen arches or flat feet.

=== Muscles ===
The muscles acting on the foot can be classified into extrinsic muscles, those originating on the anterior or posterior aspect of the lower leg, and intrinsic muscles, originating on the dorsal (top) or plantar (base) aspects of the foot.

==== Extrinsic ====
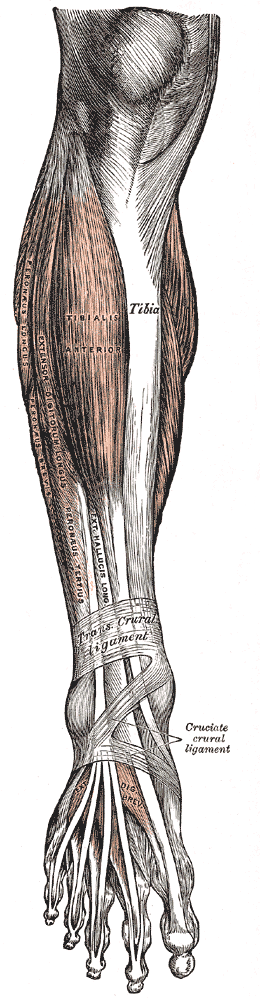
Anterior leg muscles

All muscles originating on the lower leg except the popliteus muscle are attached to the bones of the foot. The tibia and fibula and the interosseous membrane separate these muscles into anterior and posterior groups, in their turn subdivided into subgroups and layers.

===== Anterior group =====
Extensor group: the tibialis anterior originates on the proximal half of the tibia and the interosseous membrane and is inserted near the tarsometatarsal joint of the first digit. In the non-weight-bearing leg, the tibialis anterior dorsiflexes the foot and lift its medial edge (supination). In the weight-bearing leg, it brings the leg toward the back of the foot, like in rapid walking. The extensor digitorum longus arises on the lateral tibial condyle and along the fibula, and is inserted on the second to fifth digits and proximally on the fifth metatarsal. The extensor digitorum longus acts similar to the tibialis anterior except that it also dorsiflexes the digits. The extensor hallucis longus originates medially on the fibula and is inserted on the first digit. It dorsiflexes the big toe and also acts on the ankle in the unstressed leg. In the weight-bearing leg, it acts similarly to the tibialis anterior.

Peroneal group: the peroneus longus arises on the proximal aspect of the fibula and peroneus brevis below it. Together, their tendons pass behind the lateral malleolus. Distally, the peroneus longus crosses the plantar side of the foot to reach its insertion on the first tarsometatarsal joint, while the peroneus brevis reaches the proximal part of the fifth metatarsal. These two muscles are the strongest pronators and aid in plantar flexion. The peroneus longus also acts like a bowstring that braces the transverse arch of the foot.

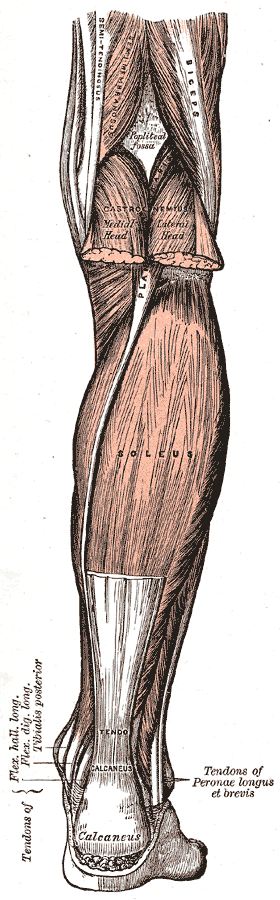
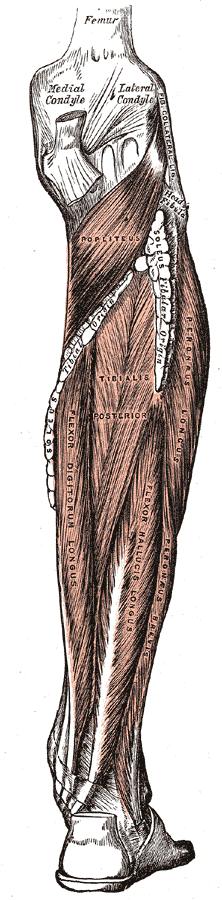
Deep and superficial layers of posterior leg muscles

===== Posterior group =====
The superficial layer of posterior leg muscles is formed by the triceps surae and the plantaris. The triceps surae consists of the soleus and the two heads of the gastrocnemius. The heads of gastrocnemius arise on the femur, proximal to the condyles, and the soleus arises on the proximal dorsal parts of the tibia and fibula. The tendons of these muscles merge to be inserted onto the calcaneus as the Achilles tendon. The plantaris originates on the femur proximal to the lateral head of the gastrocnemius and its long tendon is embedded medially into the Achilles tendon. The triceps surae is the primary plantar flexor. Its strength becomes most obvious during ballet dancing. It is fully activated only with the knee extended, because the gastrocnemius is shortened during flexion of the knee. During walking it not only lifts the heel, but also flexes the knee, assisted by the plantaris.

In the deep layer of posterior muscles, the tibialis posterior arises proximally on the back of the interosseous membrane and adjoining bones, and divides into two parts in the sole of the foot to attach to the tarsus. In the non-weight-bearing leg, it produces plantar flexion and supination, and, in the weight-bearing leg, it proximates the heel to the calf. The flexor hallucis longus arises on the back of the fibula on the lateral side, and its relatively thick muscle belly extends distally down to the flexor retinaculum where it passes over to the medial side to stretch across the sole to the distal phalanx of the first digit. The popliteus is also part of this group, but, with its oblique course across the back of the knee, does not act on the foot.

==== Intrinsic ====
On the top of the foot, the tendons of extensor digitorum brevis and extensor hallucis brevis lie deep in the system of long extrinsic extensor tendons. They both arise on the calcaneus and extend into the dorsal aponeurosis of digits one to four, just beyond the penultimate joints. They act to dorsiflex the digits. Similar to the intrinsic muscles of the hand, there are three groups of muscles in the sole of foot, those of the first and last digits, and a central group:

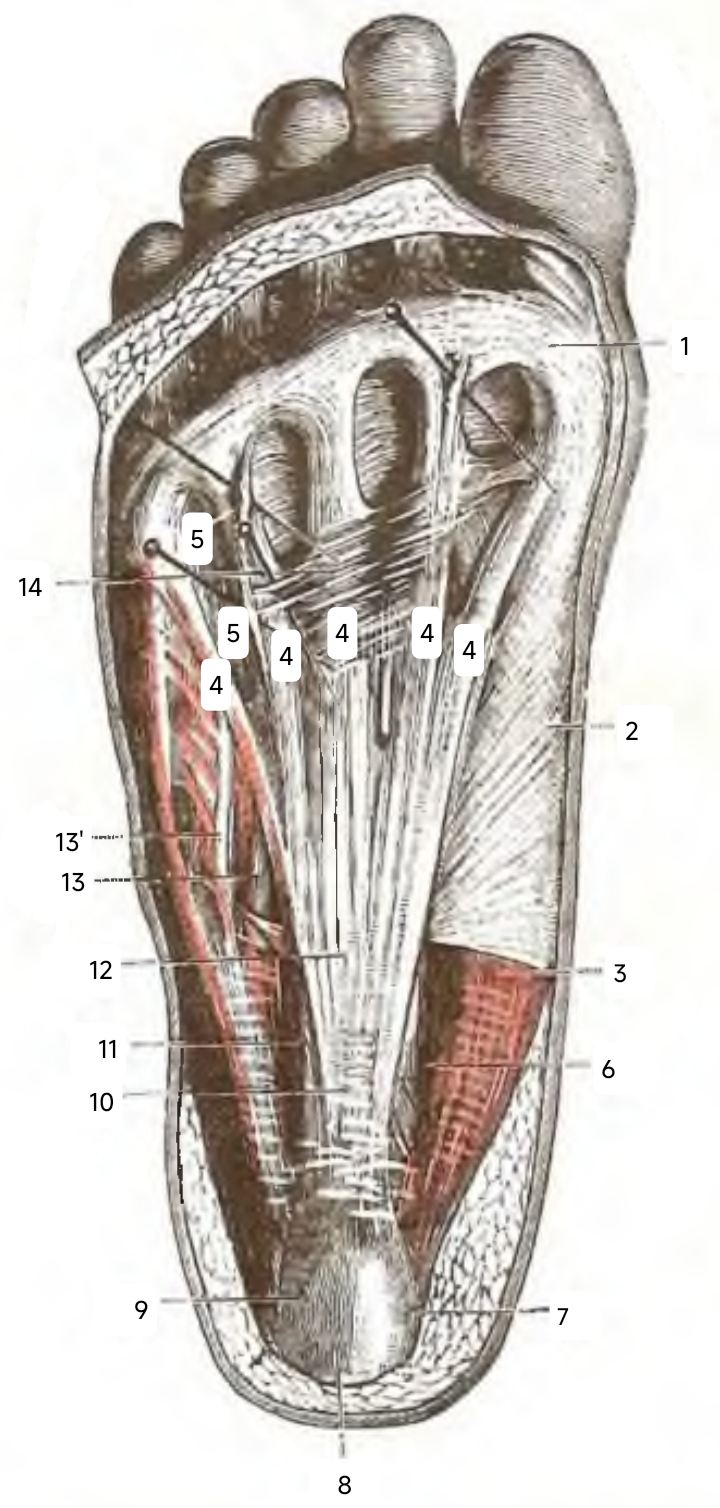
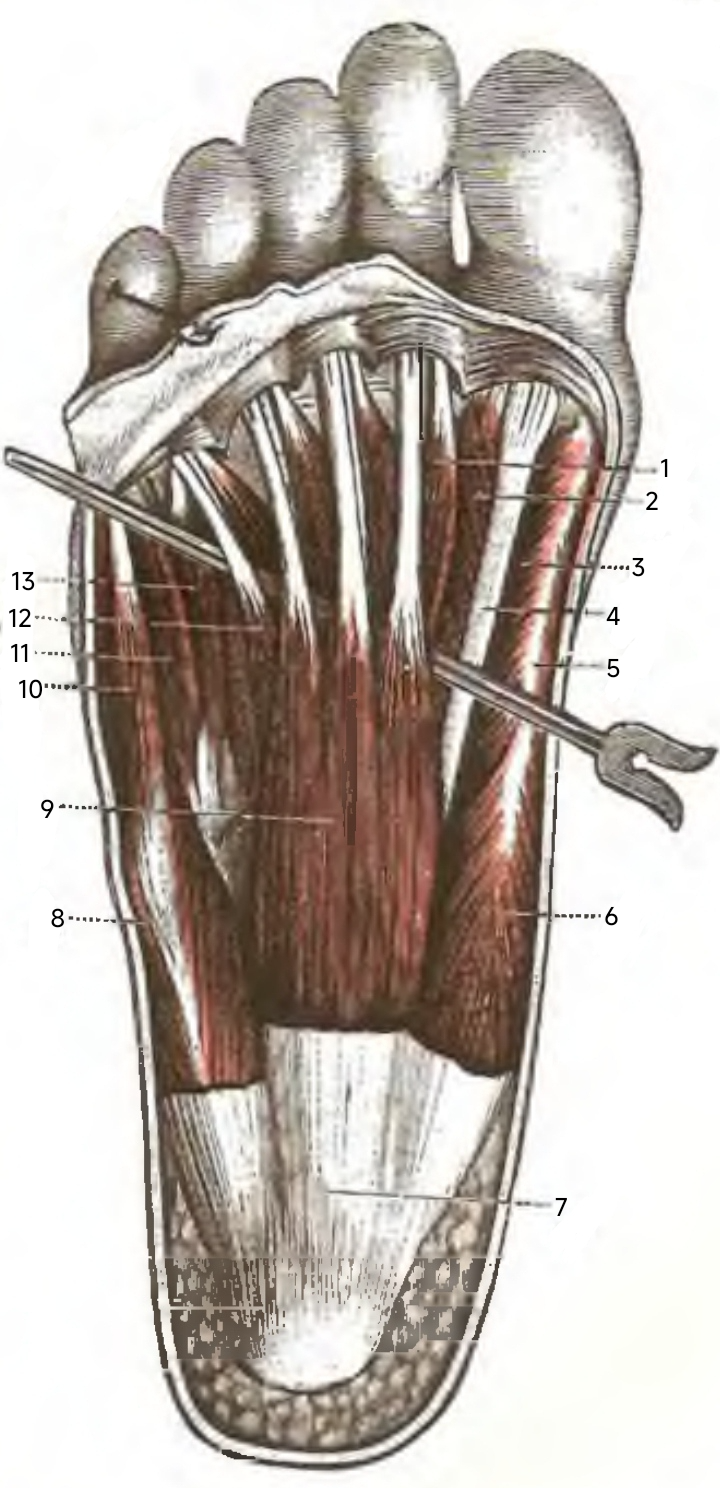
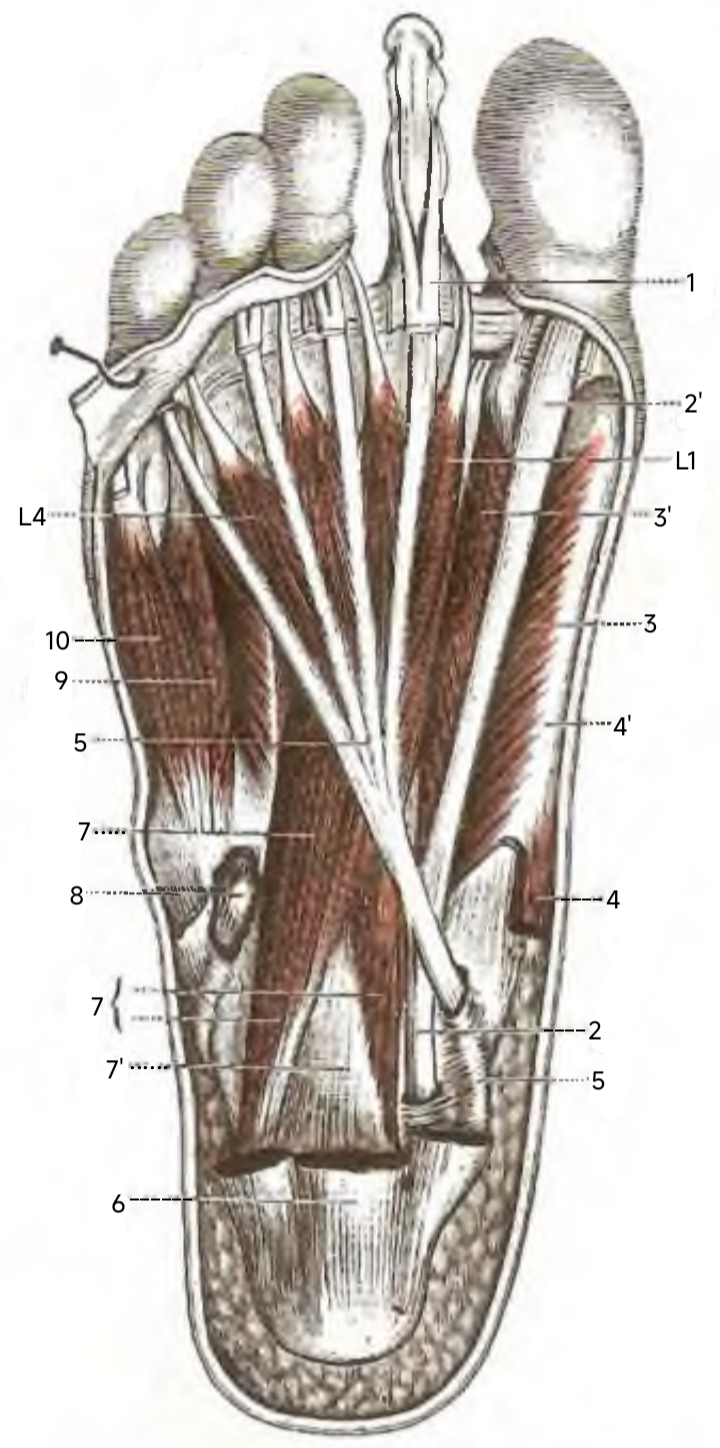
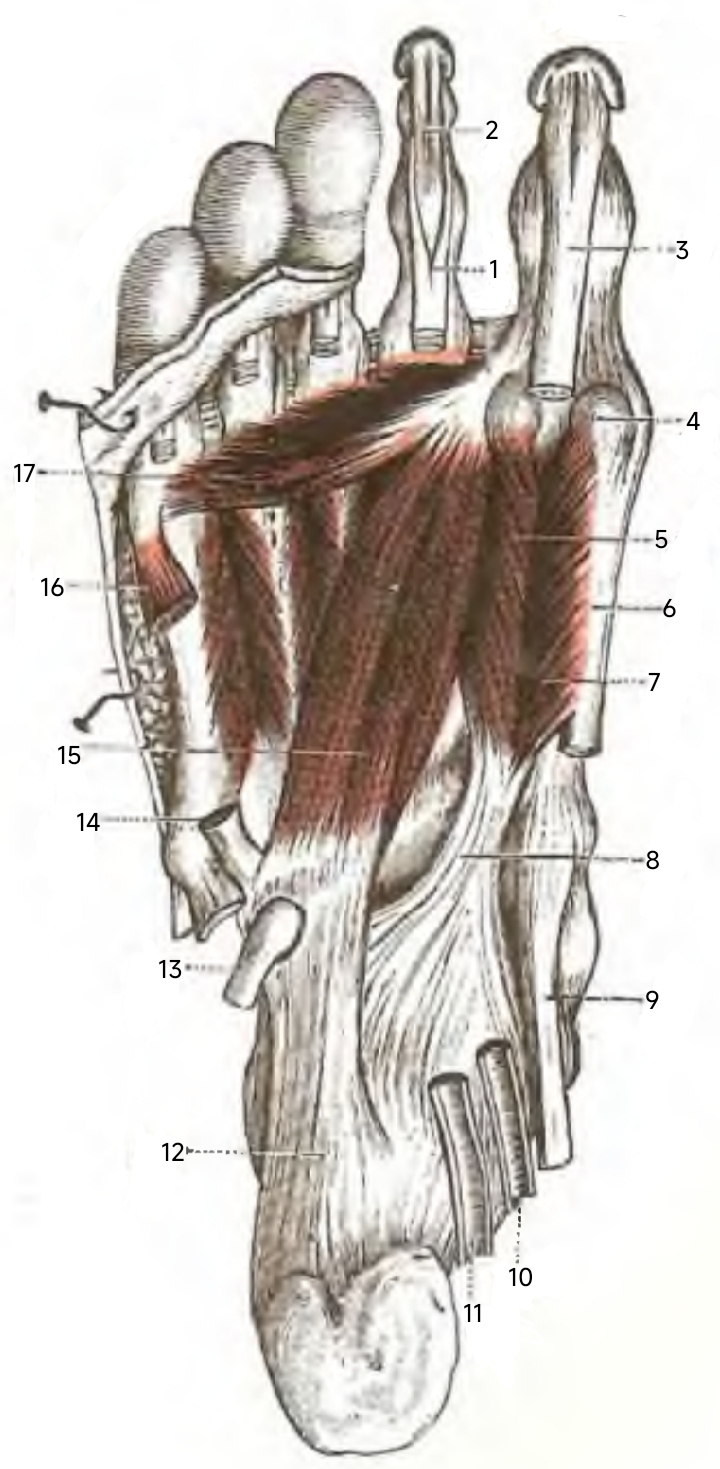
Plantar aspects of foot, varying depths (superficial to deep)

Muscles of the big toe: the abductor hallucis stretches medially along the border of the sole, from the calcaneus to the first digit. Below its tendon, the tendons of the long flexors pass through the tarsal canal. The abductor hallucis is an abductor and a weak flexor, and also helps maintain the arch of the foot. The flexor hallucis brevis arises on the medial cuneiform bone and related ligaments and tendons. An important plantar flexor, it is crucial to ballet dancing. Both these muscles are inserted with two heads proximally and distally to the first metatarsophalangeal joint. The adductor hallucis is part of this group, though it originally formed a separate system (see contrahens). It has two heads, the oblique head originating obliquely across the central part of the midfoot, and the transverse head originating near the metatarsophalangeal joints of digits five to three. Both heads are inserted into the lateral sesamoid bone of the first digit. The adductor hallucis acts as a tensor of the plantar arches and also adducts the big toe and might plantar flex the proximal phalanx.

Muscles of the little toe: Stretching laterally from the calcaneus to the proximal phalanx of the fifth digit, the abductor digiti minimi form the lateral margin of the foot and are the largest of the muscles of the fifth digit. Arising from the base of the fifth metatarsal, the flexor digiti minimi is inserted together with abductor on the first phalanx. Often absent, the opponens digiti minimi originates near the cuboid bone and is inserted on the fifth metatarsal bone. These three muscles act to support the arch of the foot and to plantar flex the fifth digit.

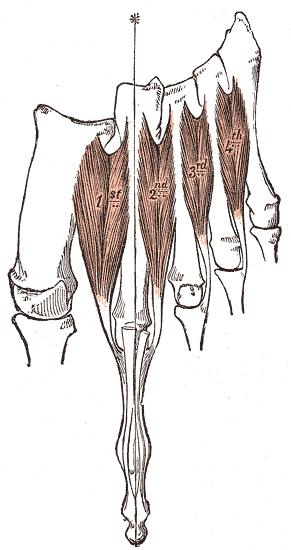
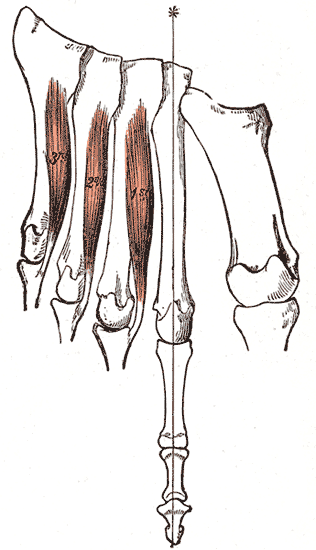
Central muscles of foot

Central muscle group: The four lumbricals arise on the medial side of the tendons of flexor digitorum longus and are inserted on the medial margins of the proximal phalanges. The quadratus plantae originates with two slips from the lateral and medial margins of the calcaneus and inserts into the lateral margin of the flexor digitorum tendon. It is also known as the flexor accessorius. The flexor digitorum brevis arises inferiorly on the calcaneus and its three tendons are inserted into the middle phalanges of digits two to four (sometimes also the fifth digit). These tendons divide before their insertions and the tendons of flexor digitorum longus pass through these divisions. Flexor digitorum brevis flexes the middle phalanges. It is occasionally absent. Between the toes, the dorsal and plantar interossei stretch from the metatarsals to the proximal phalanges of digits two to five. The plantar interossei adduct and the dorsal interossei abduct these digits, and are also plantar flexors at the metatarsophalangeal joints.

== Clinical significance ==
Due to their position and function, feet are exposed to a variety of potential infections and injuries, including athlete's foot, bunions, ingrown toenails, Morton's neuroma, plantar fasciitis, plantar warts, and stress fractures. In addition, there are several genetic disorders that can affect the shape and function of the feet, including clubfoot or flat feet.

This leaves humans more vulnerable to medical problems that are caused by poor leg and foot alignments. Also, the wearing of shoes, sneakers and boots can impede proper alignment and movement within the ankle and foot. For example, high-heeled shoes are known to throw off the natural weight balance (this can also affect the lower back). For the sake of posture, flat soles with no heels are advised.

A doctor who specializes in the treatment of the feet practices podiatry and is called a podiatrist. A pedorthist specializes in the use and modification of footwear to treat problems related to the lower limbs.

Fractures of the foot include:

- Lisfranc injury – an injury in which one or all of the metatarsals are displaced from the tarsus
- Jones fracture – a fracture of the fifth metatarsal
- March fracture – a fracture of the distal third of one of the metatarsals occurring because of recurrent stress
- Calcaneal fracture
- Broken toe – a fracture of a phalanx
- Cuneiform fracture – Due to the ligamentous support of the midfoot, isolated cuneiform fractures are rare.

== Pronation ==
In anatomy, pronation is a rotational movement of the forearm (at the radioulnar joint) or foot (at the subtalar and talocalcaneonavicular joints). Pronation of the foot refers to how the body distributes weight as it cycles through the gait. During the gait cycle the foot can pronate in many different ways based on rearfoot and forefoot function. Types of pronation include neutral pronation, underpronation (supination), and overpronation.

=== Neutral pronation ===
An individual who neutrally pronates initially strikes the ground on the lateral side of the heel. As the individual transfers weight from the heel to the metatarsus, the foot will roll in a medial direction, such that the weight is distributed evenly across the metatarsus. In this stage of the gait, the knee will generally, but not always, track directly over the hallux.

This rolling inward motion as the foot progresses from heel to toe is the way that the body naturally absorbs shock. Neutral pronation is the most ideal, efficient type of gait when using a heel strike gait; in a forefoot strike, the body absorbs shock instead via flexion of the foot.

=== Overpronation ===
As with a neutral pronator, an individual who overpronates initially strikes the ground on the lateral side of the heel. As the individual transfers weight from the heel to the metatarsus, however, the foot will roll too far in a medial direction, such that the weight is distributed unevenly across the metatarsus, with excessive weight borne on the hallux. In this stage of the gait, the knee will generally, but not always, track inward.

An overpronator does not absorb shock efficiently. Imagine someone jumping onto a diving board, but the board is so flimsy that when it is struck, it bends and allows the person to plunge straight down into the water instead of back into the air. Similarly, an overpronator's arches will collapse, or the ankles will roll inward (or a combination of the two) as they cycle through the gait. An individual whose bone structure involves external rotation at the hip, knee, or ankle will be more likely to overpronate than one whose bone structure has internal rotation or central alignment. An individual who overpronates tends to wear down their running shoes on the medial (inside) side of the shoe toward the toe area.

When choosing a running or walking shoe, a person with overpronation can choose shoes that have good inside support—usually by strong material at the inside sole and arch of the shoe. It is usually visible. The inside support area is marked by strong greyish material to support the weight when a person lands on the outside foot and then roll onto the inside foot.

=== Underpronation (supination) ===
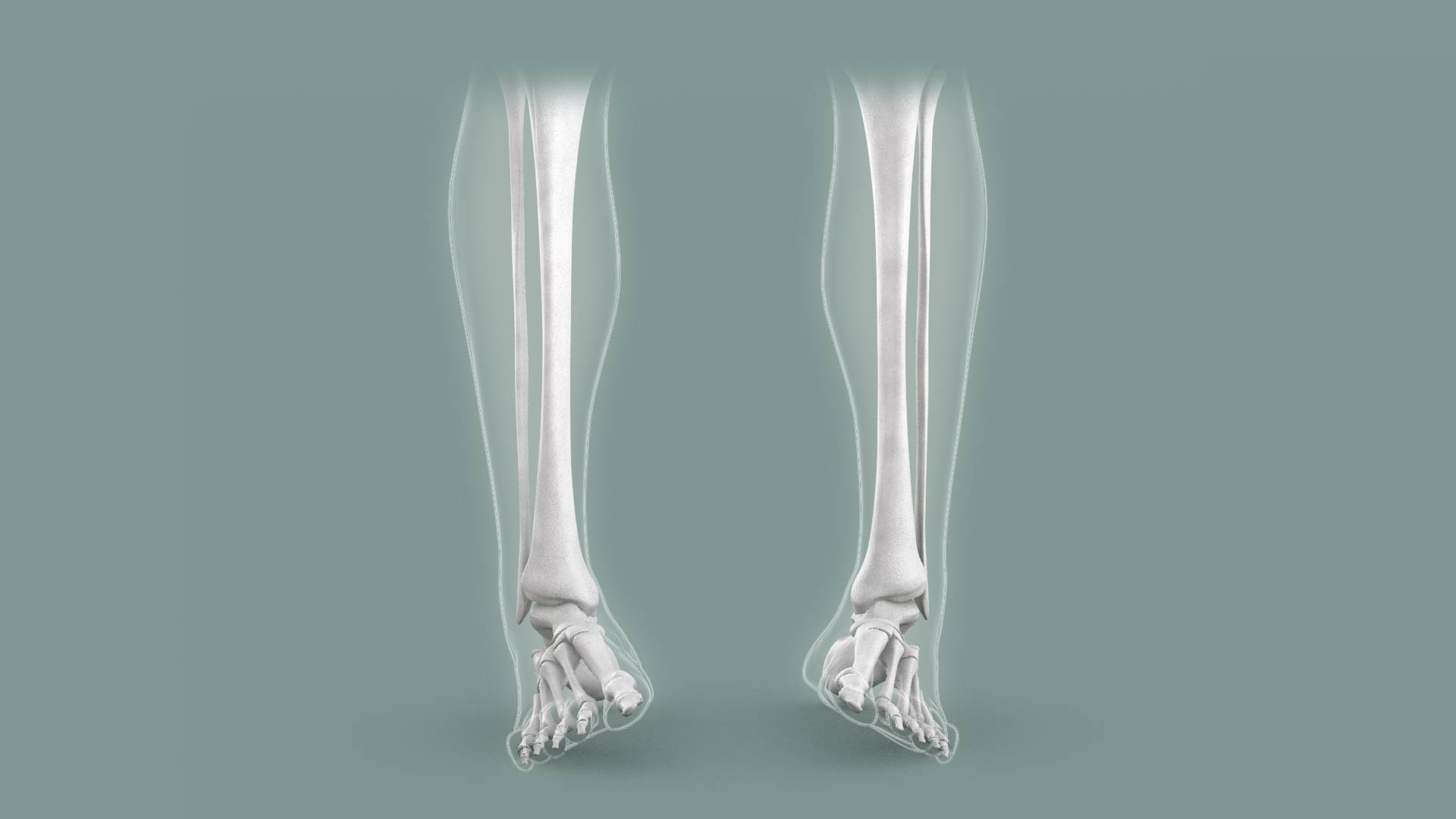
Underpronation of foot

An individual who underpronates also initially strikes the ground on the lateral side of the heel. As the individual transfers weight from the heel to the metatarsus, the foot will not roll far enough in a medial direction. The weight is distributed unevenly across the metatarsus, with excessive weight borne on the fifth metatarsal, toward the lateral side of the foot. In this stage of the gait, the knee will generally, but not always, track laterally of the hallux.

Like an overpronator, an underpronator does not absorb shock efficiently, but for the opposite reason. The underpronated foot is like a diving board that, instead of failing to spring someone in the air because it is too flimsy, fails to do so because it is too rigid. There is virtually no give. An underpronator's arches or ankles do not experience much motion as they cycle through the gait. An individual whose bone structure involves internal rotation at the hip, knee, or ankle will be more likely to underpronate than one whose bone structure has external rotation or central alignment. Usually – but not always – those who are bow-legged tend to underpronate. An individual who underpronates tends to wear down their running shoes on the lateral (outside) side of the shoe toward the rear of the shoe in the heel area.

== Society and culture ==
Humans usually wear shoes or similar footwear for protection from hazards when walking outside. There are a number of contexts where it is considered inappropriate to wear shoes. Some people consider it rude to wear shoes into a house and sacred places in multiple cultures like Māori Marae, which should only be entered with bare feet.

Foot fetishism is the most common sexual fetish for otherwise non-sexual body parts.

== Other animals ==
A paw is the soft foot of a mammal, generally a quadruped, that has claws or nails (e.g., a cat or dog's paw). A hard foot is called a hoof. Depending on style of locomotion, animals can be classified as plantigrade (sole walking), digitigrade (toe walking), or unguligrade (nail walking).

The metatarsals are the bones that make up the main part of the foot in humans, and part of the leg in large animals or paw in smaller animals. The number of metatarsals are directly related to the mode of locomotion with many larger animals having their digits reduced to two (elk, cow, sheep) or one (horse). The metatarsal bones of feet and paws are tightly grouped compared to, most notably, the human hand where the thumb metacarpal diverges from the rest of the metacarpus.

== Metaphorical and cultural usage ==
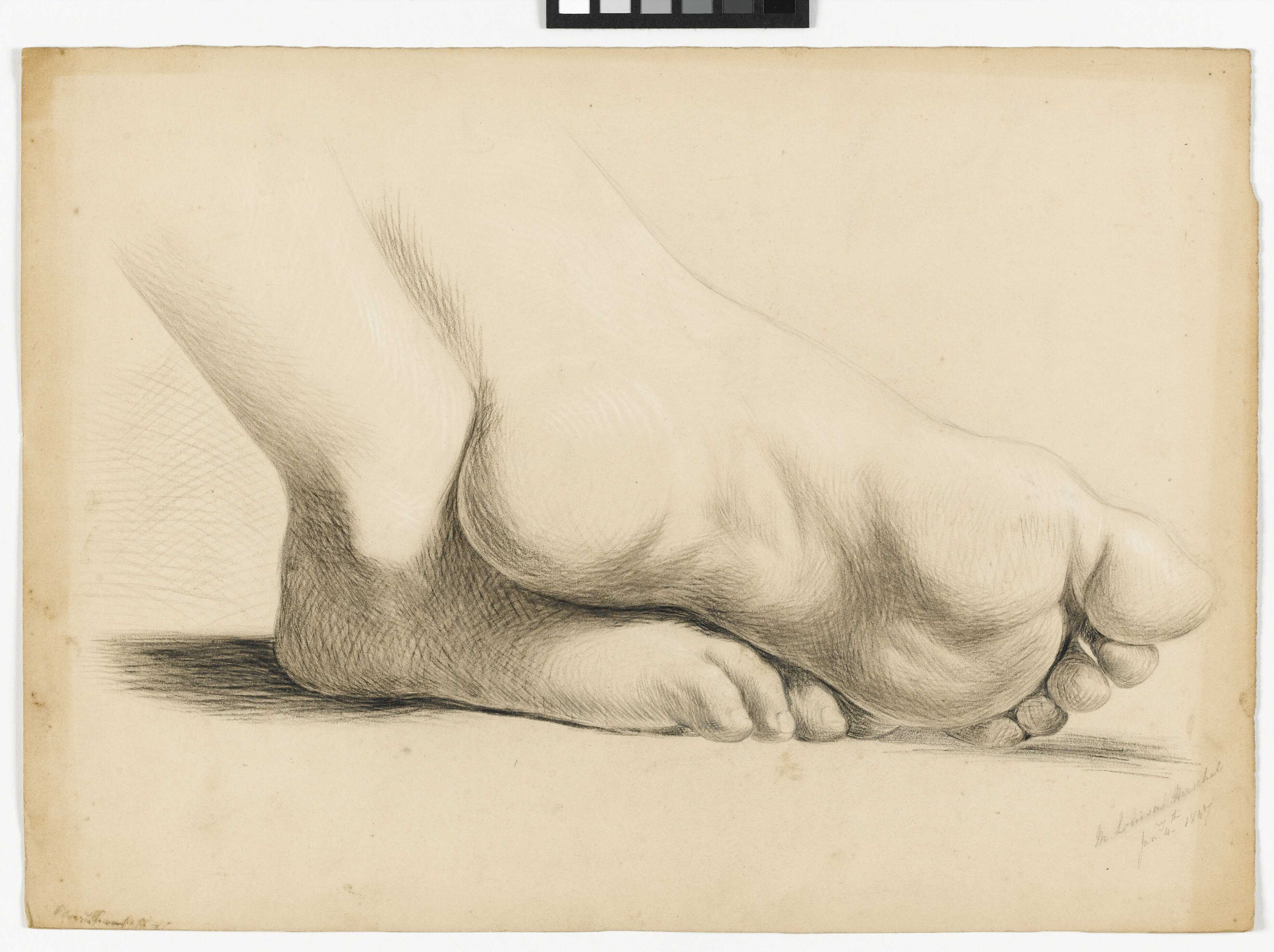
Study of a pair of feet crossed, 1847, by Margaret Louisa Herschel, daughter of John Herschel, from the Royal Museums Greenwich

The word "foot" was first used to describe a unit of measurement in Old English. Though the exact length varies by country and time period, it was originally based on the length of a man's foot. In modern standardization, it is equivalent to 12 inches or 0.3048 metres.

The word "foot" also has a musical meaning; a "metrical foot" is a rhythmic unit consisting of a group of syllables with a specific pattern of stress or length.; it is based on the rise and fall of a foot.

Idioms using feet include:

- To put one's foot in it, to make a mess of something, which is from 1823.
- To have one's foot in the grave, or to be near death, is from 1844.
- To put one's best foot foremost was first recorded in 1849.
- To get off on the wrong foot is from 1905. The variant get off on the right foot is from 1907.
- To put one's foot in (one's) mouth; to say something stupid, attested by 1942.

The word "footloose" was first used in the 1690s, meaning "free to move the feet, unshackled"; the figurative sense of "free to act as one pleases" was first used in 1873. Like "footloose", "flat-footed" at first had its obvious literal meaning (in 1600, it meant "with flat feet") but by 1912 it meant "unprepared" in U.S. baseball slang.

== See also ==
- Ball (foot)
- Barefoot
- Comparison of orthotics
- Flat feet
- Foot binding
- Foot fetishism
- Foot gymnastics
- Gait analysis
- Pedobarography (foot pressure analysis)
- Pes cavus
- Runner's toe, repetitive injury seen in runners
- Squatting position
