= SH3BP2 =

Protein found in humans

Identifiers
- Aliases: SH3BP2, 3BP-2, 3BP2, CRBM, CRPM, RES4-23, SH3 domain binding protein 2
- External IDs: OMIM: 602104; MGI: 1346349; GeneCards: SH3BP2
Available structures
PDB	Ortholog search: PDBe RCSB
PDB	List of PDB id codes 2CR4, 3TWR

Gene location (Human)
Chr.	Chromosome 4 (human)
Band	4p16.3	Start	2,793,071 bp
Band	4p16.3	End	2,841,098 bp

Gene location (Mouse)
Chr.	Chromosome 5 (mouse)
Band	5|5 B2	Start	34,683,182 bp
Band	5|5 B2	End	34,720,985 bp
RNA expression pattern
Bgee	Human / Mouse (ortholog); Top expressed in: granulocyte; sural nerve; monocyte; spleen; skin of abdomen; blood; skin of leg; upper lobe of left lung; ganglionic eminence; right lung / Top expressed in: granulocyte; secondary oocyte; zygote; primary oocyte; stroma of bone marrow; spleen; ganglionic eminence; ventricular zone; genital tubercle; blood; More reference expression data
BioGPS	n/a
Orthologs
Databases	NCBI: entry; OMA: entry
Species	Human	Mouse
Entrez	6452	24055
Ensembl	ENSG00000087266	ENSMUSG00000054520
UniProt	P78314	Q06649
RefSeq (mRNA)	NM_001122681; NM_001145855; NM_001145856; NM_003023	NM_001136088; NM_001145858; NM_001145859; NM_011893
RefSeq (protein)	NP_001116153; NP_001139327; NP_001139328; NP_003014	n/a
Location (UCSC)	Chr 4: 2.79 – 2.84 Mb	Chr 5: 34.68 – 34.72 Mb
PubMed search
- Wikidata
View/Edit Human	View/Edit Mouse

SH3 domain-binding protein 2 is a protein that in humans in encoded by the SH3BP2 gene located on Chromosome 4.

== Tissue distribution ==
This protein is widely expressed in hematopoietic cells, including: macrophages, B and T lymphocytes, and osteoclast progenitor cells.

== Structure ==
SH3 domain-binding protein 2 (SH3BP2) is a modular adaptor protein with a distinctive domain architecture that enables its functional roles in signal transduction and immune regulation. The structure of SH3BP2 includes an N-terminal pleckstrin homology (PH) domain that binds membrane phosphatidylinositol lipids and facilitates associations with G proteins and protein kinase C. This is followed by a central proline-rich region, which is responsible for interacting directly with SH3 domains of other proteins, making SH3BP2 a key scaffold in assembling signaling complexes. Finally, the C-terminal Src homology 2 (SH2) domain enables recognition and binding of phosphotyrosine motifs, further expanding its repertoire of signaling partners. SH3BP2 undergoes multiple phosphorylation events on tyrosine and serine residues, which modulate its function and binding interactions, and is subject to post-translational modifications such as ADP-ribosylation and ubiquitination.

== Function ==
It functions as an adaptor protein involved in signaling pathways, in concert with SRC kinases, SYK, and PLCγ, affecting immune cell activation, inflammatory signaling, and bone metabolism—it is also associated with cherubism. It binds to phosphatidylinositol, linking the hemopoietic tyrosine kinase fes to the cytoplasmic membrane in a phosphorylation-dependent mechanism.

== Clinical significance ==
=== Bone reabsorption ===
A gain-of-function mutation in the protein's exon 9 region leads to several common mutations that affect its proline-rich domain, resulting in its hyperactivation. This upregulation of SH3BP2 increases osteoclast formation and activity, causing bone reabsorption and cyst-like lesions in a TNF-α-dependent mechanism.

Mutated SH3BP2 can lead to upregulation of pro-inflammatory cytokines, including Tumor Necrosis Factor-alpha (TNF-α), interleukin 1-beta (IL-1β), and RANKL, creating a positive feedback loop furthering osteoclast activation.

=== Cherubism ===
SH3BP2 is the key gene implicated in cherubism, a rare autosomal dominant disorder marked by painless, symmetric swelling of the jaw due to excessive bone resorption and replacement with fibro-osseous tissue. Gain-of-function mutations in SH3BP2 enhance osteoclast formation and activity, particularly in response to signaling molecules like RANKL and TNF-α, resulting in the formation of characteristic jawbone lesions containing abundant multinucleated giant cells. Experimental models and patient analyses have revealed elevated inflammatory cytokines (including TNF-α and IL-1β) in cherubism, highlighting SH3BP2’s central role in modulating both osteoclastogenesis and sterile inflammatory bone loss.

=== Gastrointestinal stromal tumors ===
SH3BP2 is a key regulator in the growth and survival of gastrointestinal stromal tumors. It supports the expression of two transcriptional factors, ETV1 and MITF, and receptor kinases, KIT and PDGFRA.

There are certain therapies for GISTs that involve silencing SH3BP2 to reduce the expression of the receptor kinases KIT and PDGFRA, which are commonly mutated and drive GISTs development. The silencing of the adaptor protein, SH3BP2, also indirectly downregulates ETV1 and MITF, through miRNA-mediated post-transcriptional repression.

== See also ==
- SH3 domain
