= Hallermann–Streiff syndrome =

Rare congenital disorder

- Other names: Oculomandibulofacial syndrome, François dyscephalic syndrome, Hallermann–Streiff–François syndrome, oculomandibulodyscephaly with hypotrichosis, Aubry syndrome, Ullrich–Fremery-Dohna syndrome
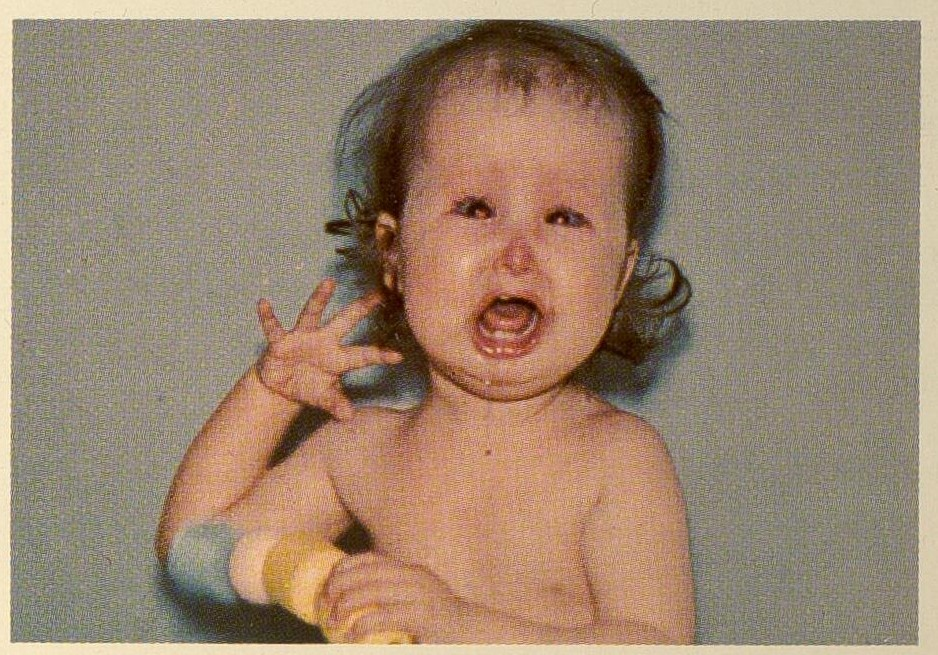
- Girl with Hallermann-Streiff syndrome displaying characteristic facial features
- Specialty: Medical genetics

Hallermann–Streiff syndrome is a congenital disorder that affects the eyes, general growth, cranial development, hair-growth, and dental development. There are fewer than 200 people with the syndrome worldwide. One notable organization that is supporting people with Hallermann–Streiff syndrome is the Germany-based "Schattenkinder e.V".

== Presentation ==
Patients with this syndrome are shorter than the average person and may not develop hair in many places, including in the facial, leg and pubic areas. Patients also have eye problems including reduced eye size, bilateral cataracts and glaucoma. The syndrome can be associated with sleep apnea. The physical characteristics of the syndrome can result in difficult intubation by medical professionals. Intelligence is usually normal.

== Cause ==
This syndrome is hypothesized to be caused by a de novo mutation in the GJA1 gene which encodes the connexin 43 protein. Further studies are needed to confirm or deny the role of connexin proteins in this disorder.

== Diagnosis ==
Diagnosis is based on the physical characteristics and symptoms.

== Treatment ==
There is no cure for Hallermann–Streiff syndrome. Treatments center around the particular symptoms in each individual. Early measures are based around ensuring proper breathing and intake of nutrients and may include a tracheostomy. Early surgery for cataracts may be recommended, however some studies have suggested that spontaneous resolution of cataracts occurs in up to 50% of untreated patients. Regular visits to an ophthalmologist to monitor and deal with other eye problems, some of which may require surgery, are strongly recommended.

Management of the condition may also include surgical reconstruction of certain craniofacial malformations (particularly in the mandibular and nasal region) at an appropriate age. Additionally, management for certain heart defects, such as medication or surgery, may be needed.

== History ==
It is named after German ophthalmologist Wilhelm Hallermann (1909–2005) and Italian–Swiss ophthalmologist Enrico Bernardo Streiff (1908–1988), who first described the syndrome in 1948 and 1950 respectively.
