= Craniofacial abnormality =

Birth defects of the cranium and facial bones

- Human skull
- Specialty: Medical genetics

Craniofacial abnormalities are congenital musculoskeletal disorders which primarily affect the cranium and facial bones.

They are associated with the development of the pharyngeal arches. Approximately, 5% of the UK or USA population present with dentofacial deformities requiring Orthognathic surgery, jaw surgery, and Orthodontics, brace therapy, as a part of their definitive treatment.

== List of conditions ==
- Platybasia
- Arrhinia - absence of the nose
- Craniosynostosis - premature fusion of the cranial sutures
- Cyclopia - one eye
- Mobius syndrome - paralysis of the facial muscles
