= Cherubism =

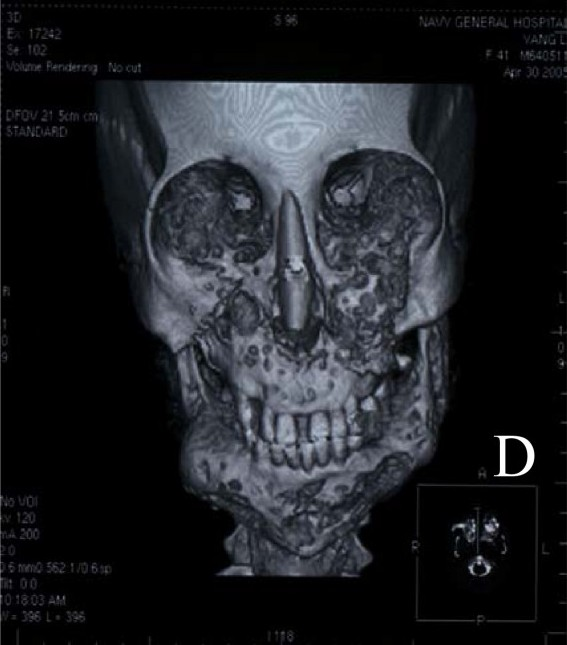
- Three-dimensional computed tomograph of a 41-year-old woman diagnosed with cherubism shows a remarkable expansion of the mandible, which can lead to a soap bubble appearance, and the bilateral bulges of the maxilla
- Specialty: Medical genetics

Cherubism is a rare genetic disorder that causes prominence in the lower portion in the face. The name is derived from the temporary chubby-cheeked resemblance to putti, the chubby-faced infants featured in Renaissance paintings, which were often mistakenly described as cherubim.

== Signs and symptoms ==
The appearance of people with the disorder is caused by a loss of bone in the mandible which the body replaces with excessive amounts of fibrous tissue. In most cases, the condition fades as the child grows, but in rare cases the condition continues to deform the affected person's face. Cherubism also causes premature loss of the primary teeth and lack of eruption and or displacement of the permanent teeth.

Cherubism is a rare autosomal dominant disease of the maxilla and mandible. 513 cases were reported in the medical literature by 2021, with 57.2% being in males. Cherubism is usually first diagnosed around age seven and continues through puberty and may or may not continue to advance with age. Degrees of cherubism vary from mild to severe. Osteoclastic and osteoblastic remodeling contributes to the change of normal bone to fibrous tissue and cyst formation. As noted by the name, the patient's face becomes enlarged and disproportionate due to the fibrous tissue and atypical bone formation. The sponge-like bone formations lead to early tooth loss and permanent tooth eruption problems. The condition also affects the orbital area, creating an upturned eye appearance. The cause of cherubism is believed to be traced to a genetic defect resulting from a mutation of the SH3BP2 gene from chromosome 4p16.3. While the condition is rare and painless, the afflicted suffer the emotional trauma of disfigurement. The effects of cherubism may also interfere with normal jaw motion and speech. Currently, removal of the tissue and bone by surgery is the only treatment available. This condition is also one of the few that unexpectedly stops and regresses. Normal bone remodeling activity may resume after puberty.

Cherubism is displayed with genetic conformation and when excessive osteoclasts are found in the affected areas of the mandible and maxilla. Large cysts will be present with excessive fibrous areas inside the bone. The fibers and cysts will be found among the trabecula of the coronoid process, the ramus of mandible, the body of mandible and the maxilla regions. The maxilla will be affected up to and including the orbits and sometimes inside the lower orbits. The maxilla and zygomatic bones are depressed and eyes appear to gaze upward. The maxilla has been found to be more severely affected in most cases than the mandible bone. Some patients found with lower inner orbital growths and cysts may lose vision.

== Causes ==
Cherubism is autosomal dominantly linked. Cherubism has also been found from the random mutation of a gene in an individual having no family history of the condition. However it is not well understood why males tend to express the disease more frequently. Children with cherubism vary in severity in their maxilla and mandible bony lesions. The disease is expressed at a rate of 80 to 100% of all affected. Studies of multiple generations of families with the gene found that all boys developed cherubism, but 30–50% of girls show no symptoms.

The cause of cherubism is believed to be from a mutation of gene of SH3BP2. Cherubism has also been found combined with other genetic disorders including Noonan syndrome, Ramon syndrome, and fragile X syndrome. SH3BP2 mutations were reported in 93.5% of the cases in which the gene was investigated and mainly occurred at protein residues 415, 418, 419, and 420. The mutation of the SH3BP2 gene is believed to increase production of over active proteins from this gene. However, Specific amino acid substitutions of SH3BP2 mutations were not associated with the clinical grading of the disease. The SH3BP2 gene is found on the smaller arm of chromosome 4 at position 16.3. The SH3BP2 protein is involved with chemical signaling to immune system cells known as macrophages and B cells.

The effects of SH3BP2 mutations are still under study, but researchers believe that the abnormal protein disrupts critical signaling pathways in cells associated with the maintenance of bone tissue and in some immune system cells. The overactive protein likely causes inflammation in the jaw bones and triggers the production of osteoclasts, which are cells that break down bone tissue during bone remodeling. Osteoclasts also sense the increased inflammation of the mandible and maxilla and are further activated to break down bone structures. Bone loss and inflammation lead to increased fibrous tissue and cyst growth. An excess of these bone-eating cells contributes to the destruction of bone in the upper and lower jaws. A combination of bone loss and inflammation likely underlies the cyst-like growths characteristic of cherubism.

== Diagnosis ==
The chemical imbalance is usually diagnosed when dental abnormalities are found. These abnormalities include premature deciduous teeth and abnormal growth of permanent teeth due to displacement by cysts and lesions. The only definite way to correctly diagnose the condition is by sequence analysis of the SH3BP2 gene. The gene has been found to have missense mutation in exon 9. Initial study of the patient is usually conducted using x-ray and CT scans. Neurofibromatosis may resemble cherubism and may accompany the condition. Genetic testing is the final diagnosis tool.

== Prevention ==
Because this genetic anomaly is genetically linked, genetic counseling may be the only way to decrease occurrences of cherubism. The lack of severe symptoms in the parents may be the cause of failure in recognizing the disorder. The optimal time to be tested for mutations is prior to having children. The disorder results from a genetic mutation, and this gene has been found to spontaneously mutate. Therefore, there may be no prevention techniques available.

== Treatment ==
Because cherubism changes and improves over time, the treatment should be individually determined. Generally, moderate cases are watched until they subside or progress into the more severe range. Severe cases may require surgery to eliminate bulk cysts and fibrous growth of the maxilla and mandible. There are few reports in the medical literature in which the patients were treated with different medical drugs. Surgical bone grafting of the cranial facial bones may be successful on some patients. Surgery is preferred for patients aged 5 to 15. Special consideration should be taken when operating on the face to avoid the marginal mandibular branch as well as the zygomatic branch of the facial nerve. Unintentional damage to these nerves can decrease muscle strength in the face and mandible region. Orthodontic treatment is generally required to avoid permanent dental problems arising from malocclusive bite and misplaced permanent teeth that have not erupted. Orthodontic treatment may be used to erupt permanent teeth that have been unable to descend due to lesions and cysts being in their path of eruption. Patients with orbital issues of diplopia, eye proptosis, and visual loss will require ophthalmologic treatment.

== Prognosis ==
Due to the rarity of the condition, it is difficult to reliably estimate statistics. However, a 2006 study which followed 7 cases over an average of 8.5 years noted that "In general, cherubism does not have a poor prognosis. It has been noted that the condition does not progress beyond puberty. As the patient grows to adulthood, the jawbone lesions tend to resolve, and a progressively more normal jaw configuration is noted."

== History ==
Cherubism was first documented and named in 1933 by W. A. Jones of Kingston, Ontario, describing a case of three siblings of the same family of Jewish Russian heritage. All that was known at the time was the characteristic swelling pattern and the increase and then regress of bone lesions. By the time the children reached the ages of fifteen, sixteen, and seventeen, the facial deformity had become an obvious disfigurement and in 1943, the children were operated on by the Jones medical team, reducing the hard swelling of their jaws. Four years following the surgeries, there was no reappearance of the swellings. Yet, in some cases dysplasia recurred after surgery, necessitating additional surgeries.

== See also ==
- Fibrous dysplasia of bone
- Robert Z'Dar, an American actor who had cherubism
