= Wissler's syndrome =

- Other names: Wissler's disease or Wissler-Fanconi syndrome
- Specialty: Immunology, rheumatology

Wissler's syndrome is a rheumatic disease that has a similar presentation to sepsis. It is sometimes considered closely related to Still's disease. It is named for Guido Fanconi and Hans Wissler. It was first described by Wissler in 1944 and Fanconi in 1946. Single observations by E. Uhse in 1943 («Febris maculosa intermittens»), Fykow in 1929 and Nowak in 1942.

== Signs and symptoms ==
Presentation includes a symptom complex characterised by the clinical features of a high intermittent fever of septic type, constantly recurring exanthema, transient arthralgia, carditis, pleurisy, neutrophil leukocytosis, and increased erythrocyte sedimentation rate.

== Causes ==
The etiology of the disease is uncertain. Wissler suggested an allergic reaction to bacteraemia as the pathogenic factor.

== Epidemiology ==
Children and adolescents are most frequently affected; age in the reported cases varied from 5 to 17 years.
