= Posterior tibial tendon dysfunction =

Medical condition in which foot/ankle tendon ruptures

- Other names: Posterior tibial tendonitis, posterior tibial tendon insufficiency, PTTD
- Specialty: Orthopedics, podiatry
- Symptoms: Pain in the feet and ankles; movement difficulties
- Usual onset: Usually over 40
- Causes: Repetitive microtrauma
- Diagnostic method: Radiographing
- Treatment: Immobilization via boot and physical therapy, custom orthotics
- Prognosis: Relatively good
- Frequency: 3.3 to 10%

Posterior tibial tendon dysfunction is the dysfunction of the posterior tibial tendon. It is a progressive disease that has four stages and is the most common cause of adult flatfoot.

== Causes ==
Agreed-upon risk factors include: obesity; hypertension; diabetes; previous injuries; joint disorders; prior disorders; and steroid use.

There have been many proposals for the cause, however the most common one is repetitive microtraumas leading to failure. However, a retromalleolar hypovascular region exists in the area and may contribute to the disease. When autopsied, cadavers with the disease show decreased blood supply. The position of the tendon is also thought to contribute, as it makes a sharp turn around the medial malleolus, putting a lot of tension on the tendon. Other proposed causes include constriction underneath the flexor retinaculum, talus abnormalities, osteoarthritis, and preexisting flatfoot. Often, the onset can occur after extensive physical activity, or injury.

== Symptoms ==
=== Stages ===
Stage 1: Tendon is intact, but damaged.

Stage 2: Tendon has ruptured. Foot begins to deform.

Stage 3: The foot is significantly deformed. Cartilage begins to degenerate.

Stage 4: Ankle joint begins to degenerate.

In early stages, patients will describe foot and ankle pain. Swelling will also be present. Patients often have difficulty standing on their toes, difficulty walking on uneven surfaces, difficulty walking up and down stairs, and unusual or uneven wear on shoes.

In later stages, the arches collapse, the ankle rolls inwards, and the ankle joint begins to degenerate. Often toes are flared due to the valgus alignment of the foot. The patient will often lose the ability to raise their heel in the affected limb.

== Diagnosis ==
Imaging is the primary method of diagnosis; however, physical evaluation will often be used to determine if more testing is required. Imaging can include x-rays, MRIs, CT scans, and ultrasounds.

=== Differential diagnosis ===
While the symptoms of PTTD are usually distinct, there are still similar conditions that should be considered.

- Tarsal coalition
- Inflammatory arthritis
- Charcot arthropathy
- Neuromuscular disease
- Traumatic disruption of midfoot ligaments

== Treatment ==
Treatment is dependent on the stage the disease is at, and certain factors such as the patient being elderly.

=== Conservative treatments ===
- Prolonged rest
- Cryotherapy
- Anti-inflammatory drugs
- Walking boot/cast for up to four weeks
- Physical therapy
- Custom molded orthotics (if physical therapy is effective)

=== Surgical treatments ===
If physical therapy fails, patients will often be referred for surgery.Surgery procedures become more invasive as the condition progresses.

- Tenosynovectomy with tubularization
- Medial calcaneal osteotomy with posterior tendon debridement and repair
- Flexor digitorum tendon (FDL) transfer
- Spring ligament reconstruction
- Achilles tendon lengthening
- Lateral column lengthening
- Isolated subtalar joint arthrodesis
- Medial double arthrodesis
- Triple arthrodesis common
- Deltoid ligament reconstruction
- Total ankle arthroplasty with replacement
- Tibiotalocalcaneal arthrodesis
- Valgus alignment
- Pantalar arthrodesis

== Complications ==
General complications include:

- Thromboembolic events
- Infection
- Wound dehiscence
- Neurologic injury
- Painful hardware

As most as of these complications stem from improper postoperative/rehabilitative care, they can generally be prevented by the right care plan being put in place.

== Prognosis ==
Prognosis is usually good, especially if caught in early stages and patient makes sure to not overextend themselves during recovery. Once disease reaches later stages, residual damage will be unavoidable, no matter how many reconstructions are done.
