= Roy Mackenzie Stewart =

Scottish neurologist

- Born: 29 March 1889; Southsea, Hampshire
- Died: 31 May 1964 (aged 75)
- Occupation: Neurologist
- Known for: Morgagni-Stewart-Morel syndrome

Roy Mackenzie Stewart FRCPE FRCP (1889–1964) was a Scottish neurologist.

After education at Lord Williams's Grammar School at Thame, Oxfordshire, Roy Mackenzie Stewart entered the University of Edinburgh Medical School and graduated there MB ChB (Edin.) in 1911. After serving on the staff of the Lancashire County Asylum at Prestwich, he joined in May 1915 the RAMC and was sent to France, where the explosion of a heavy gun caused him to have tinnitus for the remainder of his life. He was then stationed as a neurologist at Moss Side Military Hospital at Maghull (near Liverpool), from 1917 in 1918 in Salonica, and from May to November 1919 at the Royal Victoria Hospital, Netley. He received in 1920 the M.D. degree from the University of Edinburgh Medical School. In 1920 he became deputy medical superintendent of Whittingham Mental Hospital.

In 1922 Stewart became medical superintendent of Leavesden Mental Hospital. He introduced new standards of medical and nursing care and established regimens of training and treatment that were advanced for the era of the 1920s. The hospital housed about 2,600 patients (mostly severe subnormals with birth defects). He personally examined each patient and personally conducted post-mortem examinations with extensive histological studies. His clinical and necropsy reports were extremely thorough and detailed, so much so that his numerous published articles consisted largely of direct quotations from his routine hospital notes.

Leavesden, which admitted adults with the lowest grade mental sub-normality, provided ample material for his researches into the histo-pathology of carbon-monoxide poisoning that led to what was to be known as the ‘Stewart-Morel syndrome' (J. Neurol. Psychopath., 1928, 8, 321–31).

Stewart was elected FRCPE in 1929 and FRCP in 1942. He was in 1942 president of the neurology section of the Royal Society of Medicine. He was from 1943 to 1946 chair of the Mental Deficiency Committee and in 1946–1947 chair of the Mental Deficiency Section of the Royal Medico-Psychological Association. He gave in 1947 the Morison lecture on Infantile Cerebral Hemiplegia to the Royal College of Physicians, Edinburgh.

== Family ==
Roy M. Stewart's father was Surgeon Rear-Admiral William Henry Stewart, M.D., deputy inspector general of the Royal Naval Medical Service. In 1923 Roy M. Stewart married Agnes Maud Stirling (1900–1994), daughter of Royal Navy Commander Thomas Willing Stirling (1866–1930), O.B.E. Roy and Agnes Stewart had two daughters and two sons. Their elder son, Desmond Stirling Stewart (1924–1981), was a prolific writer on Middle Eastern history and culture – he wrote over a dozen books, including the Time-Life book Early Islam and a biography of T. E. Lawrence. Their younger son, Thomas H. M. Stewart (b. 1930), became a physician and professor of medicine at the School of Medicine of the University of Ottawa.

== Selected publications ==
- Stewart, R. M. (August 1920). "A contribution to the histopathology of carbon-dioxide poisoning". J Neurol Psychopathol. 1 (2): 105–116. doi:10.1136/jnnp.s1-1.2.105. PMC 1067891. PMID 21611442.
- with W. R. Ashby: Stewart, R. M.; Ashby, W. R. (April 1931). "Angioma arteriale racemosum in an acallosal brain: a clinical and pathological report". J Neurol Psychopathol. 11 (44): 289–303. doi:10.1136/jnnp.s1-11.44.289. PMC 1038760. PMID 21611327.
- with W. R. Ashby: Ashby, W. R.; Stewart, R. M. (April 1933). "Size in mental deficiency". J Neurol Psychopathol. 13 (52): 303–329. doi:10.1136/jnnp.s1-13.52.303. PMC 1038803. PMID 21611376.
- Stewart, R. M. (13 July 1935). "An atypical form of tuberous sclerosis. Report of a case". Br Med J. 2 (3888): 60, 74–2. doi:10.1136/bmj.2.3888.60. PMC 2460891. PMID 20779211.
- Stewart, R. M. (October 1939). "Arhinencephaly". J Neurol Psychiatry. 2 (4): 303–312. doi:10.1136/jnnp.2.4.303. PMC 1088151. PMID 21610958.
- "Observations on the Pathology of Cerebral Diplegia (Abridged), President's Address". Proceedings of the Royal Society of Medicine, Section of Neurology. XXXVI: 25–32. 1942. doi:10.1177/003591574203600104. PMC 1998325.
