= Hyperostosis frontalis interna =

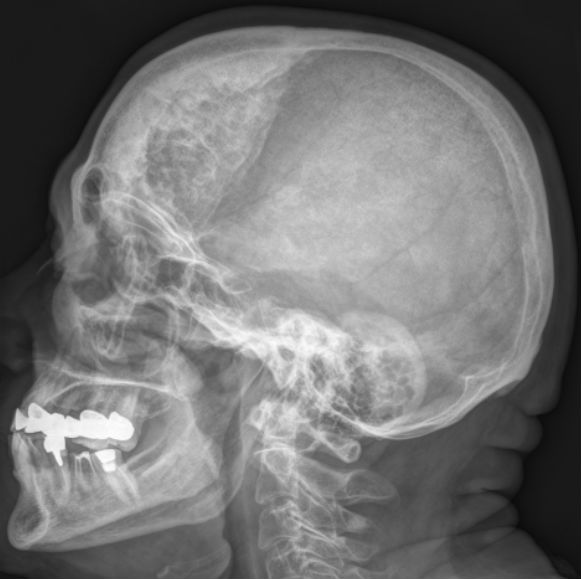
- Hyperostosis frontalis interna in a 74-year-old woman
- Specialty: Radiology

Hyperostosis frontalis interna is a common, benign thickening of the inner side of the frontal bone of the skull. It is found predominantly in women after menopause and is usually asymptomatic. Most frequently it is found as an incidental finding discovered during an X-ray or CT scan of the skull.

== Additional images ==
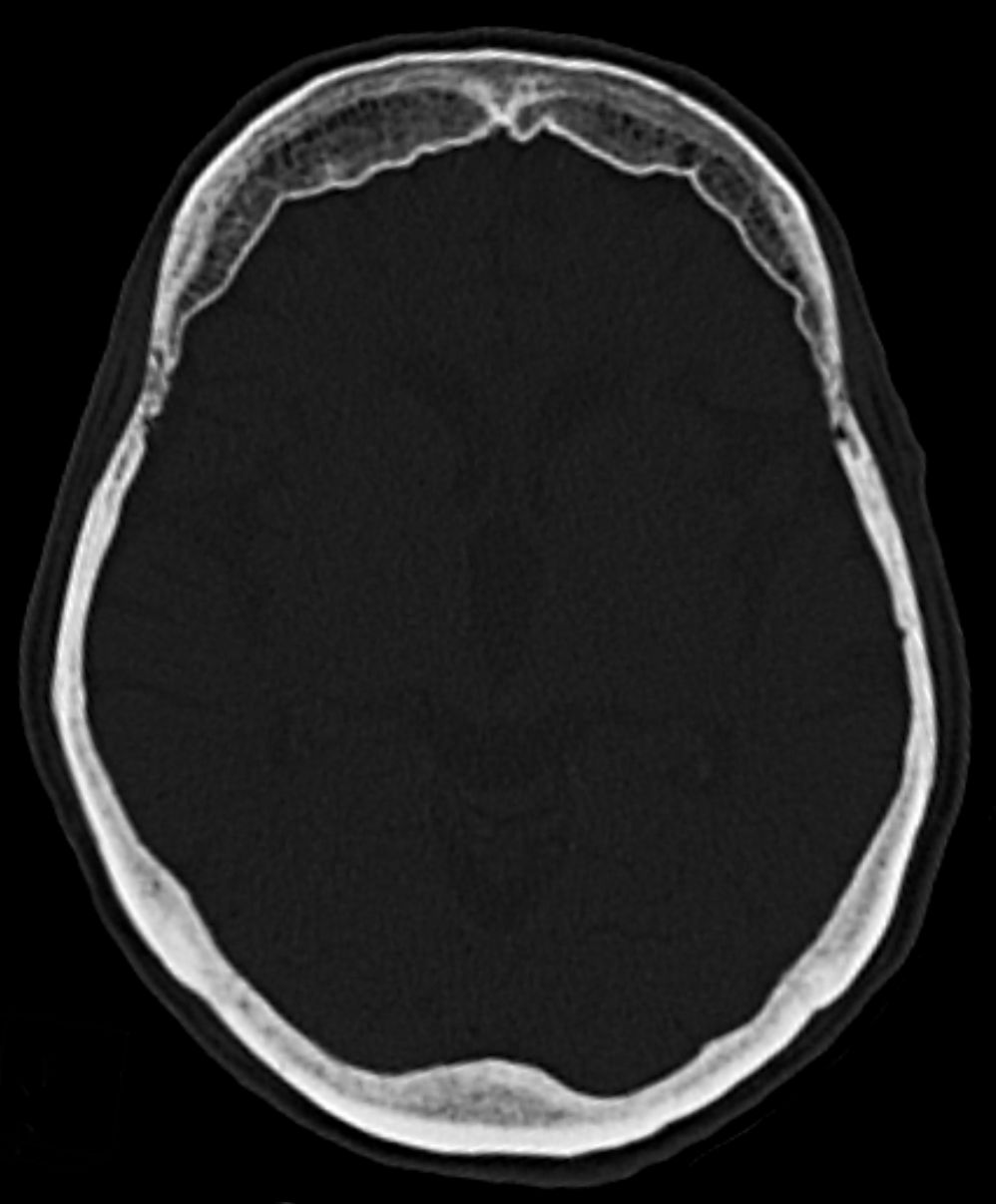
Hyperostosis frontalis at CT
