= List of disorders of foot and ankle =

Disorders of the foot and ankle include conditions affecting the skin, joints, bones, and nerves, as well as combined and genetic disorders and manifestations of systemic disease.

== Disorders of the skin ==
- Athlete's foot
- Callus and Corns of the Skin
- Onychocryptosis (Ingrown Toenail)
- Keratosis palmaris et plantaris

== Disorders of the joints ==
- Arthritis mutilans
- Hallux valgus (bunion)
- Hallux varus
- Diabetic Arthropathy (Charcot Foot)
- Rheumatoid arthritis
- Osteoarthritis

== Disorders of the bones ==
- Fracture
- Jones Fracture
- Dupuytren fracture or Pott's fracture
- Osteomyelitis
- Bone cancer

== Disorders of the nerves ==
- Tarsal tunnel syndrome
- Neuroma
- Metatarsalgia
- Nerve entrapment

== Combined disorders ==
- Pes cavus (Cavus foot)
- Club foot

== Genetic disorders ==
- Polydactyly

== Specific manifestations of systemic disease ==
- Diabetic foot
- Rheumatoid foot
- Neuropathy
- Plantar fasciitis
