= Platybasia =

- Specialty: Neurosurgical, orthopedic
- Symptoms: Platybasia is characterised by abnormal flattening of the skull base as defined as a base of skull angle over 143º.In the absence of neural compression, pain at the back of the skull and upper part of the neck is the most common symptom. Neural compression may affect the medulla and nerve roots from the lower brainstem, particularly those that might affect swallowing and the cough reflex.

Platybasia is a spinal disease of a malformed relationship between the occipital bone and cervical spine.

It may be caused by Paget's disease. Platybasia is also a feature of Gorlin-Goltz syndrome, commonly known as basal cell nevus syndrome. It may be developmental in origin or due to softening of the skull base bone, allowing it to be pushed upward. The developmental variant is the result of a wider angle between the skull base of the frontal or anterior fossa and the clivus, which defines the anterior wall of the posterior fossa. It is sometimes associated with other congenital abnormalities of the bone structure, such as fusion of the first cervical vertebrae to the skull atlas assimilation.
