= Plantar ligament =

Plantar ligament refer to ligaments in the sole of the foot:

- Plantar plates, fibrocartilaginous structures in the metatarsophalangeal and interphalangeal joints of the toes.
- One of several tarsal, metatarsal, and tarsometatarsal ligaments:
  - Long plantar ligament, that connects the calcaneus with the cuboid bone
  - Plantar calcaneocuboid ligament, deep to previous
  - Plantar calcaneonavicular ligament, that connects the calcaneus with the navicular bone
  - Plantar cuneonavicular ligaments, that connect the navicular bone with adjacent cuneiform bones
  - Plantar intercuneiform ligaments, between the cuneiform bones
  - Plantar cuboideonavicular ligament, that connects the cuboid with the navicular bone
  - Plantar cuneocuboid ligament, that connects the cuboid with the cuneiform bones

== See also ==
- Palmar ligament (disambiguation)
