= Cuneocuboid ligament =

Cuneocuboid ligament may refer to:

- Dorsal cuneocuboid ligament
- Interosseous cuneocuboid ligament
- Plantar cuneocuboid ligament
