= Metatarsal ligaments =

Metatarsal ligaments may refer to:

- Dorsal metatarsal ligaments
- Interosseous metatarsal ligaments
- Plantar metatarsal ligaments
- Transverse metatarsal ligament
