= Intercuneiform ligaments =

Intercuneiform ligaments may refer to:

- Dorsal intercuneiform ligaments
- Interosseous intercuneiform ligaments
- Plantar intercuneiform ligaments
