= Intercuneiform joints =

Joints in the foot

Intercuneiform and cuneocuboid joints
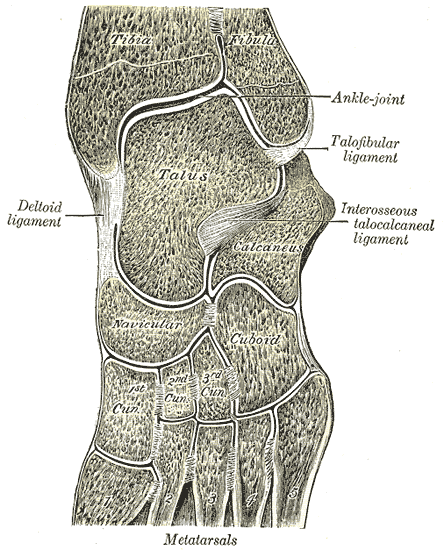
- Oblique section of left intertarsal and tarsometatarsal joints, showing the synovial cavities.

Details

Identifiers
- Latin: articulationes intercuneiformes
- TA98: A03.6.10.401
- TA2: 1951
- FMA: 35213

The intercuneiform joints are the joints (articulations among) the cuneiform bones.

The term "cuneocuboid joint" is sometimes used to describe the joint between the cuboid and lateral cuneiform, but this term is not recognized by Terminologia Anatomica.

== Ligaments ==
The three cuneiform bones and the cuboid bone are connected together by dorsal, plantar, and interosseous ligaments.

=== Dorsal ligaments ===
The dorsal ligaments consist of three transverse bands: one connects the first with the second cuneiform, another the second with the third cuneiform, and another the third cuneiform with the cuboid.

=== Plantar ligaments ===
The plantar ligaments have a similar arrangement to the dorsal, and are strengthened by slips from the tendon of the tibialis posterior.

=== Interosseous ligaments ===
The interosseous ligaments consist of strong transverse fibers which pass between the rough non-articular portions of the adjacent surfaces of the bones.

== Synovial membrane ==
The synovial membrane of these joints is part of the great tarsal synovial membrane.

== Movements ==
The movements permitted between these bones are limited to a slight gliding upon each other.
