= Intertarsal joints =

Joints in the human foot bones

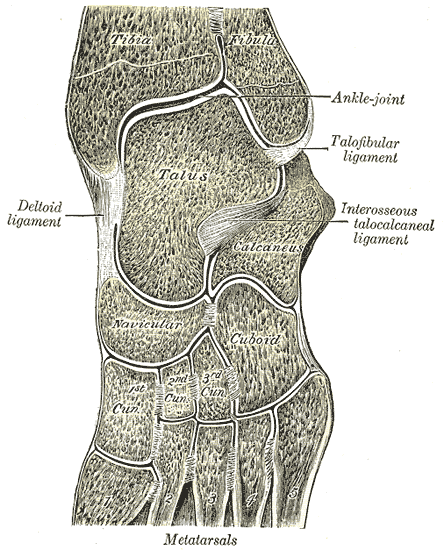
- Oblique section of left intertarsal and tarsometatarsal joints, showing the synovial cavities.

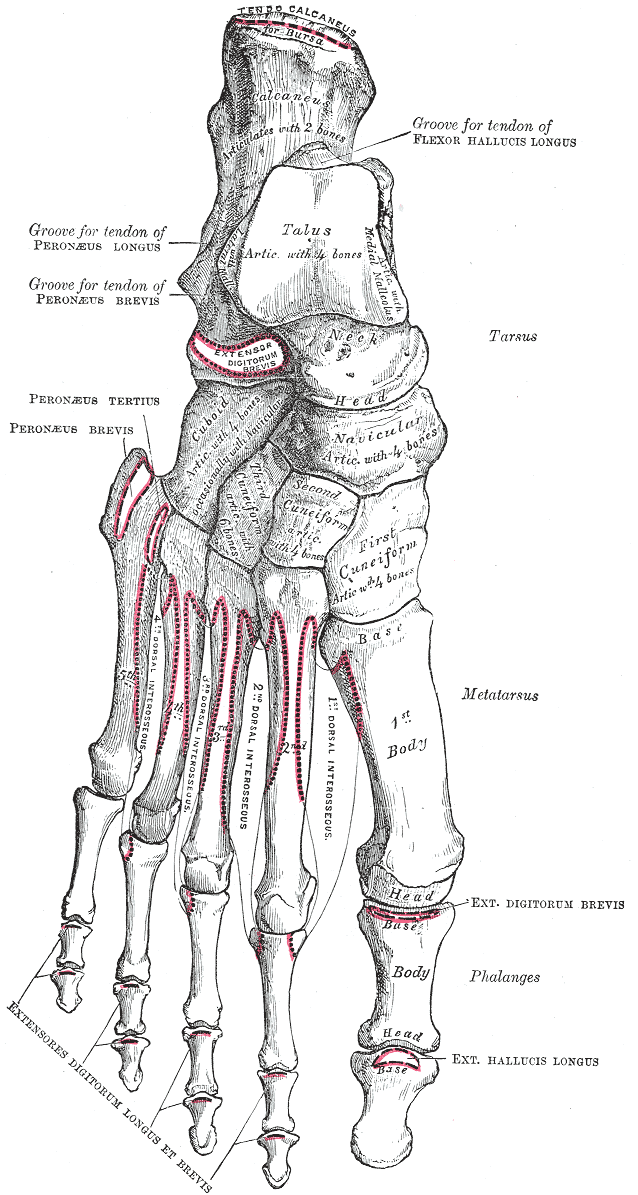
- Bones of the right foot. Dorsal surface.

Details

Identifiers
- Latin: Articulationes intertarseae
- MeSH: D013640
- TA2: 1923

The intertarsal joint are the joints of the tarsal bones in the foot. There are six specific inter tarsal joints (articulations) in the human foot:

- Subtalar joint, also known as the talocalcaneal articulation
- Talocalcaneonavicular joint
- Calcaneocuboid joint
- Cuneonavicular joint
- Cuboideonavicular joint
- Intercuneiform joints
