= Dorsal ligament =

Dorsal ligament can refer to:

- Dorsal radioulnar ligament
- Dorsal radiocarpal ligament
- Dorsal cuboideonavicular ligament
- Dorsal intercarpal ligament
- Dorsal intercuneiform ligaments
- Dorsal tarsometatarsal ligaments
- Dorsal metatarsal ligaments
