= Cuboideonavicular joint =

Joint in the foot

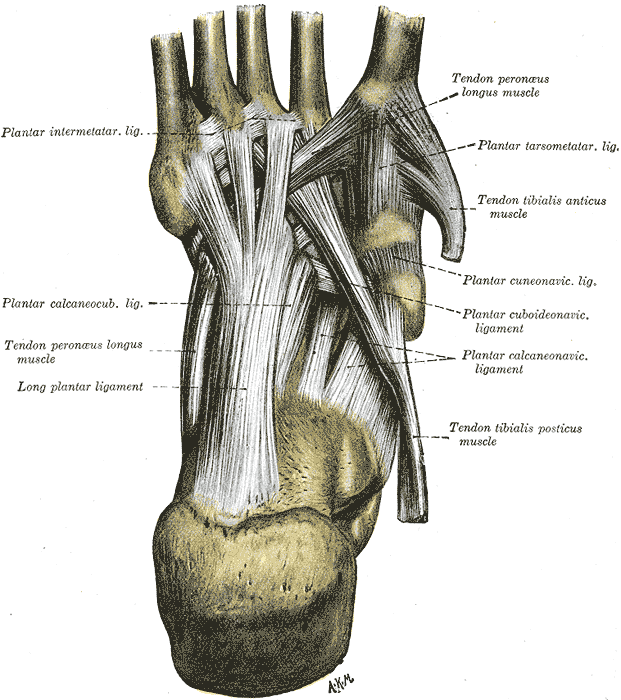
- Ligaments of the sole of the foot, with the tendons of the fibularis longus, tibialis posterior and tibialis anterior muscles. (Plantar cuboideonavicular ligament labeled at center right.)

Details

Identifiers
- Latin: articulatio cuboideonavicularis
- TA2: 1948
- FMA: 44349

The cuboideonavicular joint is a joint (articulation) in the foot formed between the navicular bone and cuboid bone. The navicular bone is connected with the cuboid bone by the dorsal, plantar, and interosseous cuboideonavicular ligaments. It is a syndesmosis type fibrous joint.

== The dorsal ligaments ==
The dorsal cuboideonavicular ligament connects the lateral portion of the navicular to the posteromedial portion of the cuboid on the dorsal side.

== The plantar ligaments ==
The plantar cuboideonavicular ligaments have a similar arrangement to the dorsal, and are strengthened by slips from the tendon of the tibialis posterior.

== Synovial membrane ==
The synovial membrane of this joints is part of the great tarsal synovial membrane.

== Movements ==
The movements at this joint are slight gliding and rotation. Mere gliding movements are permitted between the navicular and cuneiform bones.
