= Cuneonavicular joint =

Joint in the human foot

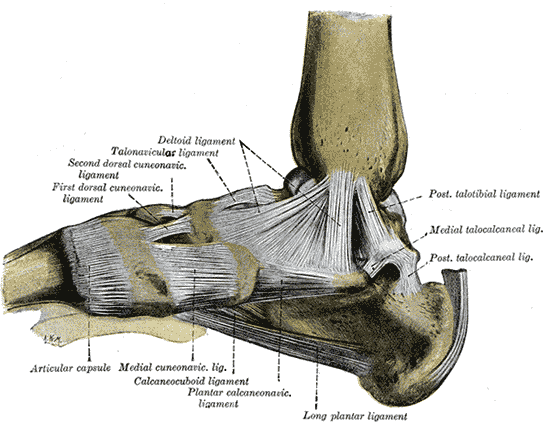
- Ligaments of the medial aspect of the foot (cuneonavicular joint labeled at upper left)

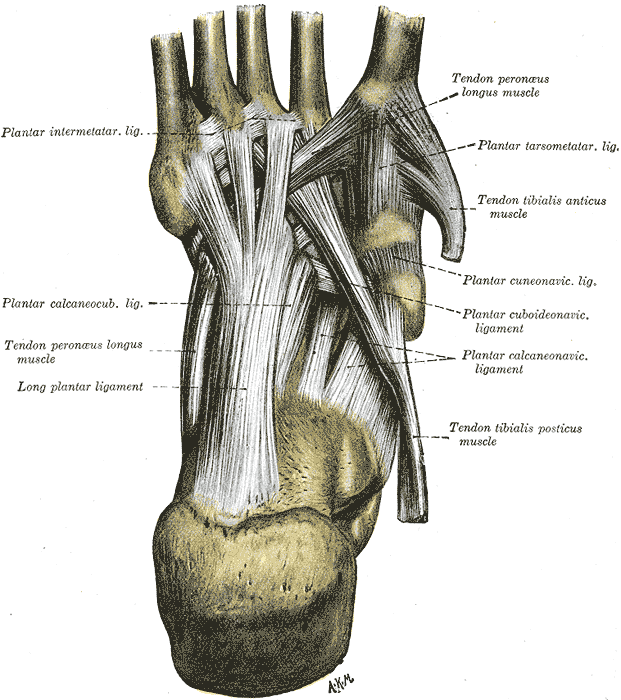
- Ligaments of the sole of the foot, with the tendons of the peroneus longus, tibialis posterior and tibialis anterior muscles (cuneonavicular articulations labeled at center right)

Details

Identifiers
- Latin: articulatio cuneonavicularis
- TA98: A03.6.10.301
- TA2: 1941
- FMA: 35210

The cuneonavicular joint is a joint (articulation) in the human foot. It is formed between the navicular bone and the three cuneiform bones. The navicular and cuneiform bones are connected by dorsal and plantar ligaments.

== Dorsal ligaments ==
The dorsal ligaments are three small bundles, one attached to each of the cuneiform bones.

The bundle connecting the navicular with the medial cuneiform bone is continuous around the medial side of the articulation with the plantar ligament which unites these two bones.

== Plantar ligaments ==
The plantar ligaments have a similar arrangement to the dorsal, and are strengthened by slips from the tendon of the tibialis posterior.

== Synovial membrane ==
The synovial membrane of these joints is part of the great tarsal synovial membrane.

== Movements ==
Mere gliding movements are permitted between the navicular and cuneiform bones.
