= Cuneonavicular ligaments =

Cuneonavicular ligaments may refer to:

- Dorsal cuneonavicular ligaments
- Plantar cuneonavicular ligaments
