= Cuboideonavicular ligament =

Cuboideonavicular ligament may refer to:

- Dorsal cuboideonavicular ligament
- Plantar cuboideonavicular ligament
