= Intermetatarsal joints =

Joints in the foot

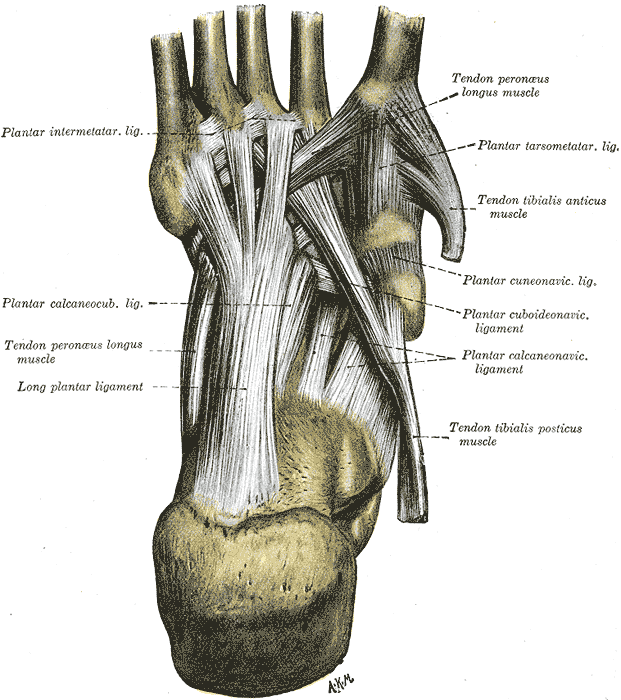
- Ligaments of the sole of the foot, with the tendons of the peronaeus longus, Ttbialis posterior and tibialis anterior muscles. (Plantar intermetatar. lig. labeled at upper left.)

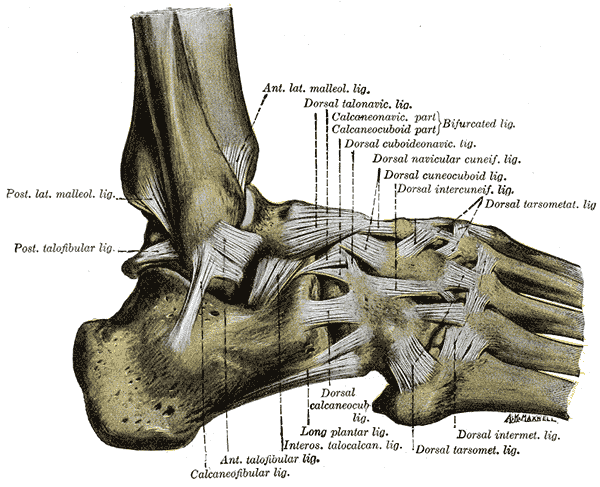
- The ligaments of the foot from the lateral aspect. (Dorsal intermet. labeled at lower right.)

Details

Identifiers
- Latin: articulationes intermetatarsales
- TA98: A03.6.10.701
- TA2: 1959
- FMA: 35219 71355, 35219

The intermetatarsal joints are the articulations between the base of metatarsal bones.

The base of the first metatarsal is not connected with that of the second by any ligaments; in this respect the great toe resembles the thumb.

The bases of the other four metatarsals are connected by the dorsal, plantar, and interosseous ligaments.

- The dorsal ligaments pass transversely between the dorsal surfaces of the bases of the adjacent metatarsal bones.
- The plantar ligaments have a similar arrangement to the dorsal.
- The interosseous ligaments consist of strong transverse fibers which connect the rough non-articular portions of the adjacent surfaces.

== Synovial membranes ==
The synovial membranes between the second and third, and the third and fourth metatarsal bones are part of the great tarsal synovial membrane; that between the fourth and fifth is a prolongation of the synovial membrane of the cuboideometatarsal joint.

== Movements ==
The movement permitted between the tarsal ends of the metatarsal bones is limited to a slight gliding of the articular surfaces upon one another.

== See also ==
- Transverse metatarsal ligament
