= Tarsometatarsal ligaments =

Tarsometatarsal ligaments may refer to:

- Dorsal tarsometatarsal ligaments
- Plantar tarsometatarsal ligaments
