= Interosseous ligament =

A Interosseous ligament can refer to:

- Dorsal intertarsal ligaments
- Interosseous ligaments of tarsus
- Bifurcated ligament
- Interosseous sacroiliac ligament
- Interosseous intercarpal ligaments
- Interosseous intercuneiform ligaments
- Interosseous metatarsal ligaments

It is sometimes used interchangeably with interosseous membrane.
