= Digitus quintus =

Digitus quintus ('fifth digit') may refer to:

- Digitus quintus manus, the little finger
- Digitus quintus pedis, the fifth toe

== See also ==
- Tailor's bunion, digitus quintus varus
