= Syndesmosis procedure =

Type of bunion surgery

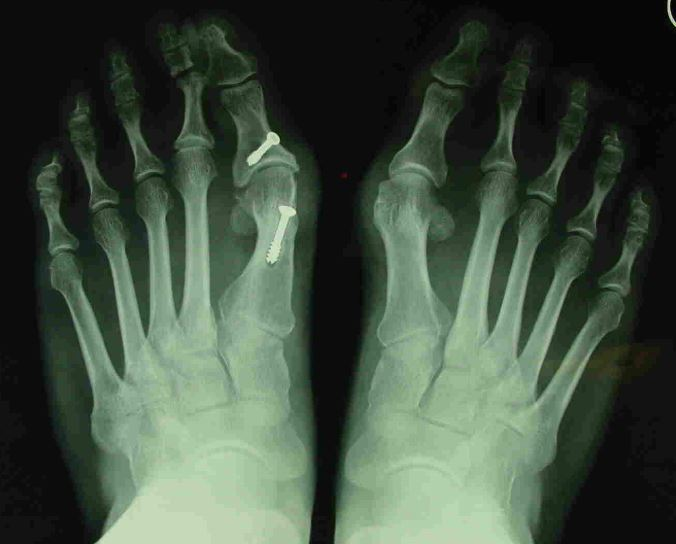
- Fig. 8a. Painful hallux valgus and metatarsus primus varus deformity recurrence of left foot after osteotomy surgery
- Specialty: Podiatry

Syndesmosis procedure is one of the more than twenty bunion surgeries currently being performed. While the majority of bunion surgeries involve the breaking and shifting of bones (osteotomy procedures), syndesmosis procedure is one of few surgical techniques that use a soft-tissue or non-osteotomy (non-bone-breaking) approach to afford the same correction. More than 130 different surgical techniques have been described for correction of one single condition of the foot: the bunion deformity.

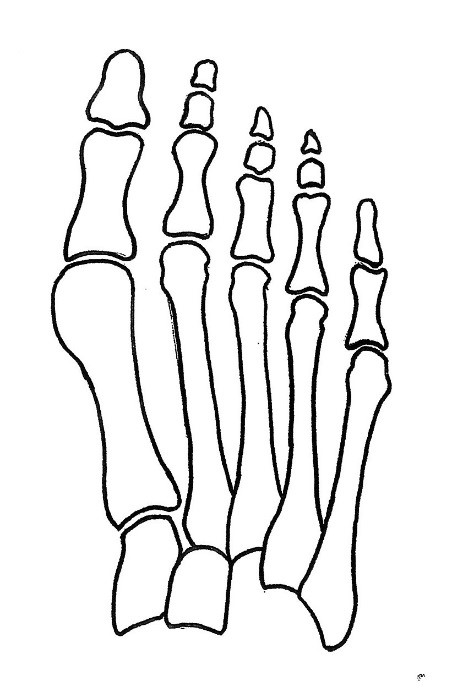
Fig 1a: Normal foot skeleton

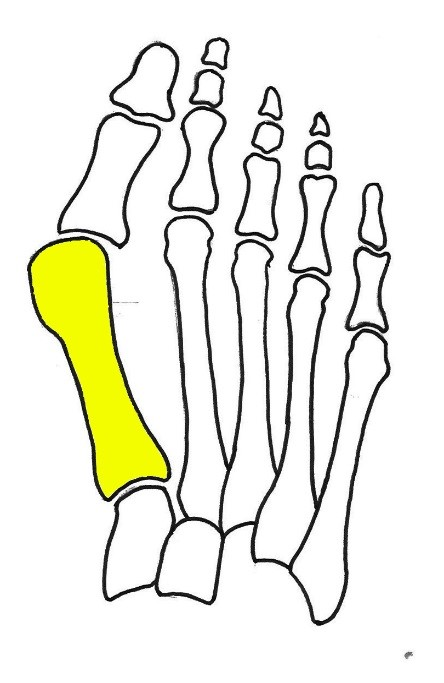
Fig. 1b: First metatarsal bone has moved aside

== Purpose ==
Bunion (hallux valgus) deformity is actually part of a complex of anatomical derangements of protruding mass (bunion), buckling of big toe (hallux valgus) and the bone behind it (metatarsus primus varus), displaced sesamoid bones (detrimental to the important walking function of big toe), collapsed metatarsal arch and several other secondary changes that are the domino effects of metatarsal primus varus. Thus, metatarsus primus varus correction has become the primary objective of all bunion surgeries.

=== Primus varus deformity ===
Primus varus deformity is the leaning of the first metatarsal bone away from the second metatarsal and towards the opposite foot (Fig. 1). As it leans over, its head sticks out to form the bunion bump and it also widens the forefoot to cause shoes feeling too tight. Thus when bunion pain becomes unmanageable, surgical correction is to narrow the forefoot by repositioning of the first metatarsal head back to its normal position. This can be done by osteotomy (bone-breaking), soft tissue (non-osteotomy) or fusion techniques.

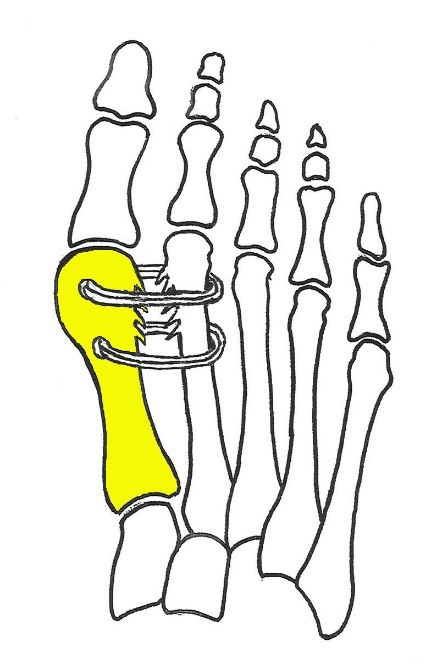
Fig. 2: Cerclage bone sutures

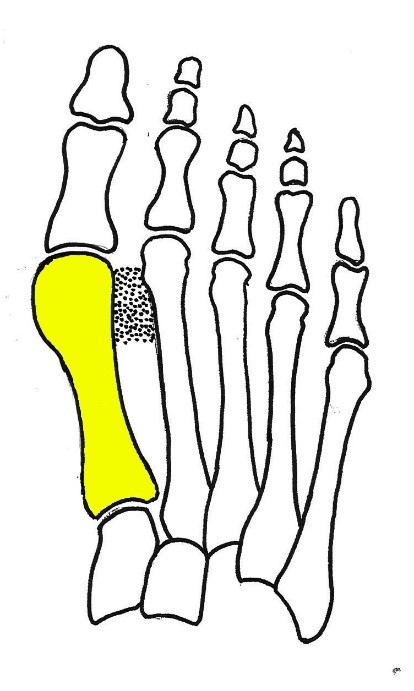
Fig. 3: Fibrous connecting bridge to prevent recurrence

What causes the metatarsus primus varus deformity?

A first metatarsal bone would lean towards one side is because “the medial hood ligament is stretched” and as it becomes weak and incompetent the first metatarsal would lose its support and then gradually shift out of place to form the metatarsus primus varus deformity.

What causes ligaments to fail?

Female hormone estrogen and genetic inheritance are the two primary factors behind the weak ligaments of bunion feet. Bunion deformity was found more common in people wearing shoes by a study in Hong Kong and increased in Japan due to changing in footwear to Western style. Aging, degeneration and trauma have also been attributed to weakening of the responsible ligaments.

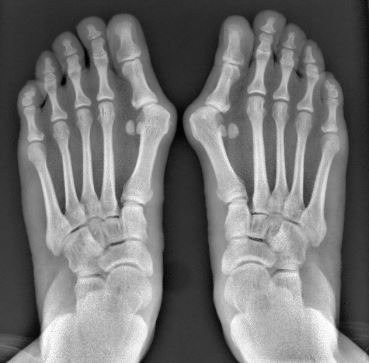
Fig. 4a: Before surgery

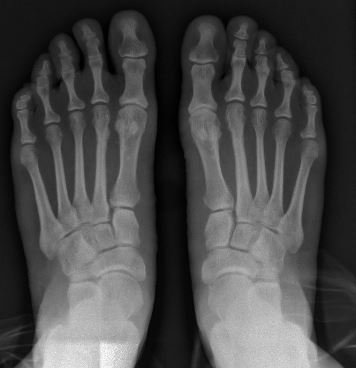
Fig. 4b: 2 years after surgery

== Technique ==
Syndesmosis procedure addresses specifically the two fundamental problems of metatarsus primus varus deformity that gives rise to the bunion deformity. They are leaning and instability of the first metatarsal bone . Syndesmosis procedure uprights the leaning first metatarsal bone with strong binding sutures between it and the second metatarsal bone (Fig. 2) and then also stabilizes it uniquely by creating a fibrous connecting bridge between these two bones (Fig. 3, 4). First metatarsal bone can be readily realigned because by definition of the metatarsus primus varus deformity its first metatarsal is abnormally loose and mobile.

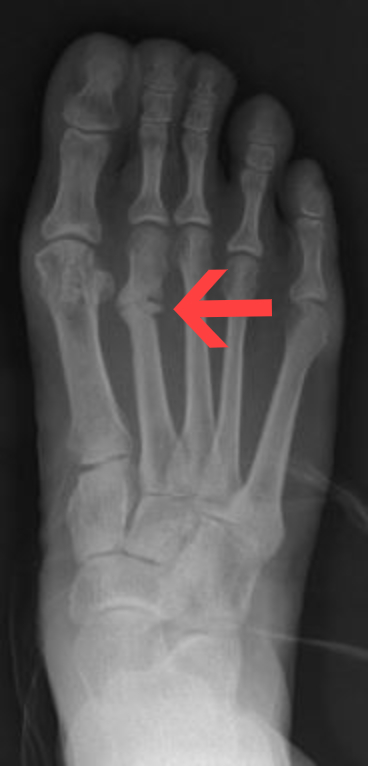
Fig. 5 Stress fracture of the second metatarsal bone

== Advantages ==
1. No breaking of bones (Less postoperative pain and swelling, Fewer possible complications, Technically simpler for surgeons)
2. Single technique can be applied to almost all severities.
3. Both feet can be done at same time.
4. Immediate weight bearing is allowed and safe.
5. Instability issue is specifically addressed to prevent recurrence.
6. Function restoration has been proven by plantar pressure study.
7. No special surgical instruments or implants are needed.

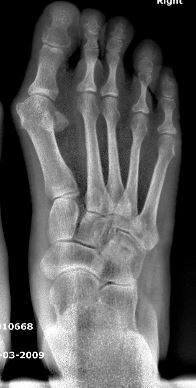
Fig. 6a: Left big toe joint shifted in sideway due to overcorrection

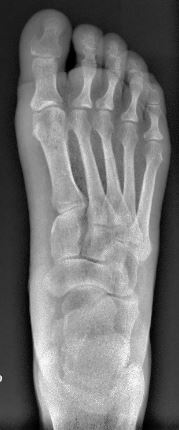
Fig. 6b: Left big toe joint shifted in sideway due to overcorrection

Specific cautions afterwards

1. Restricted walking of no more than 5,000 steps a day for three months
2. No sports or high heels for six months

Possible complications

1. Wound infection
2. Cutaneous nerve injury
3. Cerclage suture breakage
4. Big toe joint stiffness
5. Second metatarsal stress fracture (Fig. 5)
6. Over-correction (Fig. 6)

== History ==
The surgical technique of syndesmosis procedure originated from the osteodesis procedure that was first described by Botteri in 1961. It has since been studied and reported by Pagella in 1971, Irwin in 1999 and Wu in 2007. Syndesmosis itself is a normal anatomical structure for the purpose of connecting two parallel long bones side by side, such as the tibia and fibula bones. The naming of syndesmosis procedure was thus to reflect the essence of the technique which is to create a “syndesmosis” mechanism to provide permanent stability to the first metatarsal to prevent recurrence. Both the bone-binding-sutures and syndesmosis-connection concepts are unique and revolutionary in a world of bunion surgery overwhelmingly dominated by osteotomy (bone-breaking) tradition.

== Other options ==
1. For severe bunion deformity correction (Fig. 7)
1. For recurrence correction after osteotomy procedure (Fig. 8)

Late deformity recurrence can happen after osteotomy (bone-breaking) procedures because osteotomy surgeries do not specifically stabilize first metatarsal bone.

For recurrence correction after fusion procedure (Fig. 9) Metatarsus primus varus deformity and pain recurred 6 months after modified Lapidus procedure and it could also be again corrected by the syndesmosis procedure.
