= Cuboid fracture =

Fracture of the cuboid bone of the foot

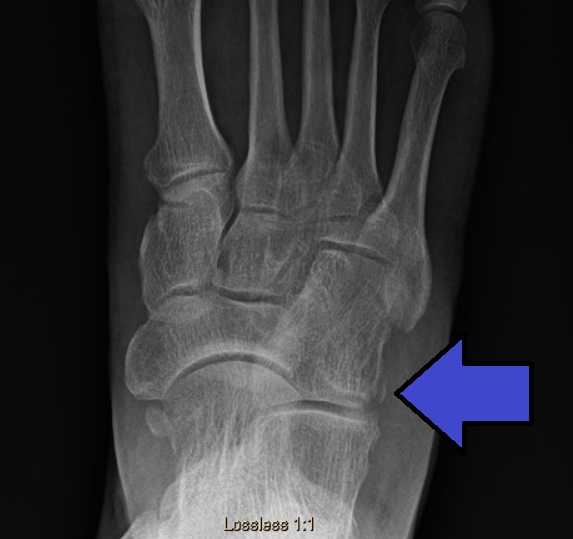
- Avulsion fracture of the right cuboid bone of the foot
- Frequency: Rare

A cuboid fracture is a fracture of the cuboid bone of the foot. Diagnosis is by X-ray imaging, magnetic resonance imaging, or bone scan. Treatment may be conservative or involve surgery, depending on the type of fracture. They are rare.

If the cuboid bone is broken, then it is common for other bones in the foot to be broken or dislocated as well. Cuboid fractures are associated with Lisfranc injuries.

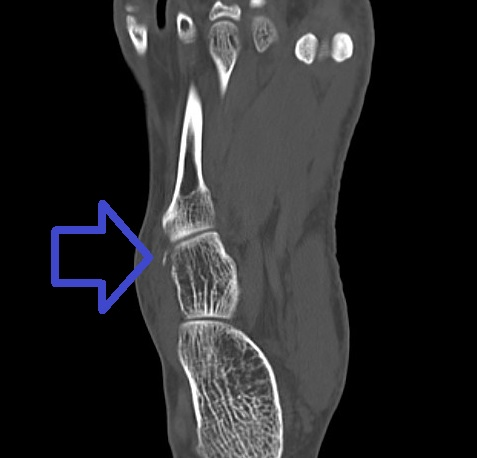
Avulsion fracture of the cuboid on CT
