= Tailor's bunion =

- Other names: Bunionette or Digitus quintus varus
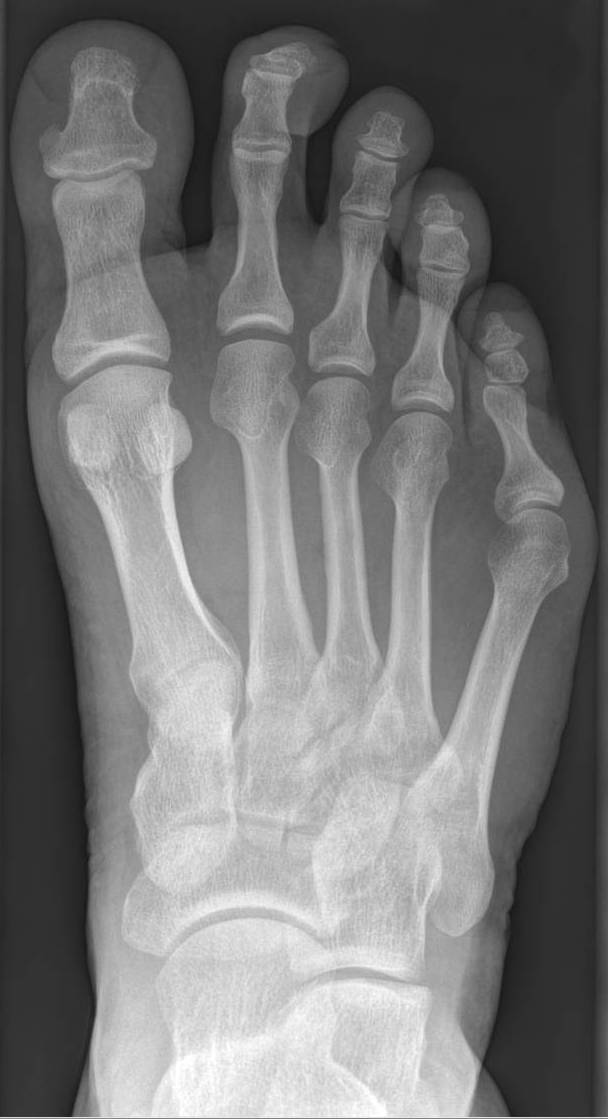
- Radiograph showing a tailor's bunion
- Specialty: Podiatry

Tailor's bunion, also known as digitus quintus varus or bunionette, is a condition caused as a result of inflammation of the fifth metatarsal bone at the base of the little toe.

It is usually characterized by inflammation, pain and redness of the little toe.

Often a tailor's bunion is caused by a faulty mechanical structure of the foot. The fifth metatarsal bone starts to protrude outward, while the little toe moves inward. This change in alignment creates an enlargement on the outside of the foot.

It is mostly similar to a bunion (the same type of ailment affecting the big toe). It is called Tailor's bunion because in past centuries, tailors sat cross-legged, and this was thought to cause this protrusion on the outside aspect of the foot.

Patients will present with a history of pain of the lateral bunion, plantar callous, and pain that increases with constrictive shoe wear. Studies have shown that tight shoe wear can cause both bunions as well as tailor's bunions.

== Treatment ==
Non-surgical therapies include:

- Shoe modifications: wearing shoes that have a wide toe box, and avoiding those with pointed toes or high heels.
- Oral nonsteroidal anti-inflammatory drugs may help in relieving the pain and inflammation.
- Injections of corticosteroid are commonly used to treat the inflammation.
- Bunionette pads placed over the affected area may help reduce pain.
- An ice pack may be applied to reduce pain and inflammation.

Surgery may be considered when pain continues for a long period and the non-surgical therapies do not yield improvement.

Surgical therapies include:

- Distal and proximal osteotomies of the 5th metatarsal can be used to correct the intermetatarsal and metatarsophalangeal angle causing the tailor's bunion.

== Diagnosis ==
Tailor's bunion is easily diagnosed because the protrusion is visually apparent. X-rays may be ordered to help the surgeon find out the severity of the deformity.

=== Types ===
Type 1: The head of the 5th metatarsal is thickened and enlarged.

Type 2: A 5th metatarsal with an increased lateral curve and a normal fourth and fifth inter-metatarsal angle.

Type 3: Has the greatest lateral angular disposition of the 5th metatarsal compared to the 4th metatarsal, this phenomenon increases the 4th and 5th inter-metatarsal angles. This is generally the most symptomatic type of Tailor's bunion.

Type 4: A combination of at least two types of bunionettes (TB).

=== Lesser toe deformities leading to falls ===
Five studies examined associations between falls and foot disorders. Significant associations were found between falls and plantar fasciitis, corns or bunions and lesser toe deformity (such as Tailor's bunions). The results of these studies show that "Older people who fell were more likely to have foot pain, hallux valgus, and lesser toe deformity".

== See also ==
- Tailor's muscle
- Bunion, also known as hallux valgus, a similar condition of the big toe.
