= Interosseous cuneocuboid ligament =

Ligament of the foot

Details
- From: cuneiform
- To: cuboid

Identifiers
- Latin: ligamentum cuneocuboideum interosseum
- TA98: A03.6.10.504
- TA2: 1945
- FMA: 44204

The interosseous cuneocuboid ligament consists of a series of fibrous bands that connect the central portion of the cuboid to the lateral surfaces of the cuneiform bones.
