= Bunion =

Deformity characterized by lateral deviation of the big toe

- Other names: Hallux abducto valgus, hallux valgus
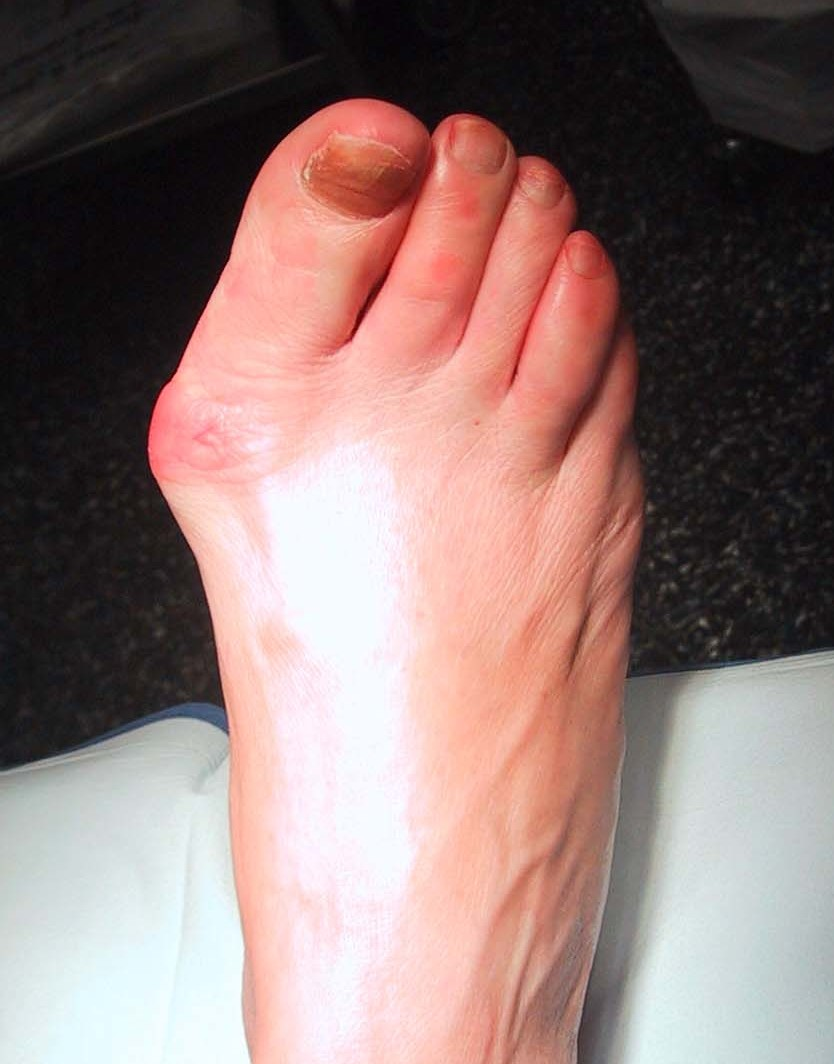
- Specialty: Orthopedics, podiatry
- Symptoms: Prominent, red, and painful joint at the base of the big toe
- Complications: Bursitis, arthritis
- Usual onset: Gradual
- Causes: Unclear
- Risk factors: Wearing overly tight shoes, high-heeled shoes, family history, rheumatoid arthritis
- Diagnostic method: Based on symptoms, X-rays
- Differential diagnosis: Osteoarthritis, Freiberg's disease, hallux rigidus, Morton's neuroma
- Treatment: Proper shoes, orthotics, NSAIDs, surgery
- Frequency: ~23% of adults

A bunion, also known as hallux valgus, is an outward deformity of the foot's metatarsophalangeal joint which connects the big toe to the foot. The rear tarsometatarsal joint that holds the metatarsal bone in a straight-ahead position weakens, and the metatarsal moves outward and rotates 90 degrees, bringing the sesamoids up against the adjacent toe. This results in the head of the metatarsal bulging outward while the big toe bends inward toward the other toes. The joint often becomes red and painful due to rubbing in a cramped shoe. The onset of bunions is typically gradual. Joint complications may include bursitis or arthritis. A similar condition of the little toe is referred to as a tailor's bunion or bunionette.

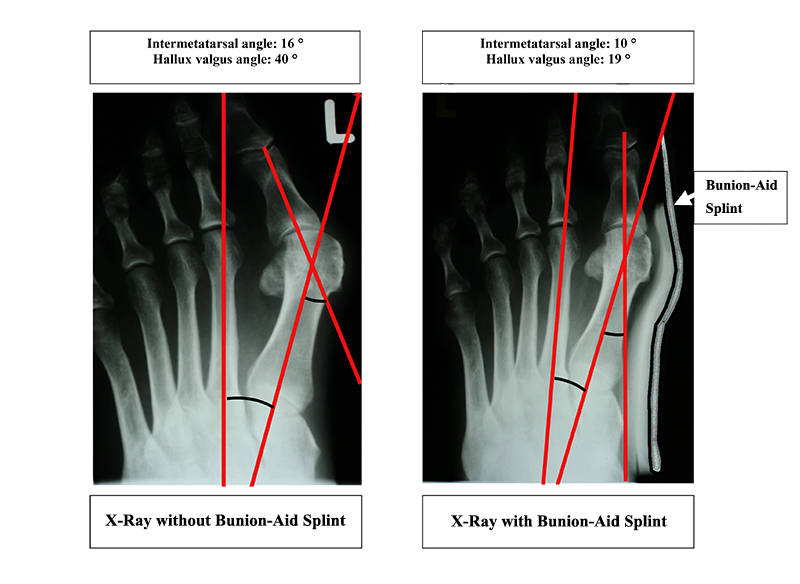

Treatment may include proper shoes, orthotics, or NSAIDs. If this is not effective for improving symptoms, surgery may be performed. Since 2020, many new and highly effective surgical techniques for bunion correction have been developed. Bunions exist in about 23% of adults. Females are affected more often than males. Usual age of onset is between 20 and 50 years old. The condition also becomes more common with age. It was first clearly described in 1870. Archaeologists have identified a high incidence of bunions in skeletons from 14th- and 15th-century England, coinciding with a fashion for pointy shoes.

== Signs and symptoms ==
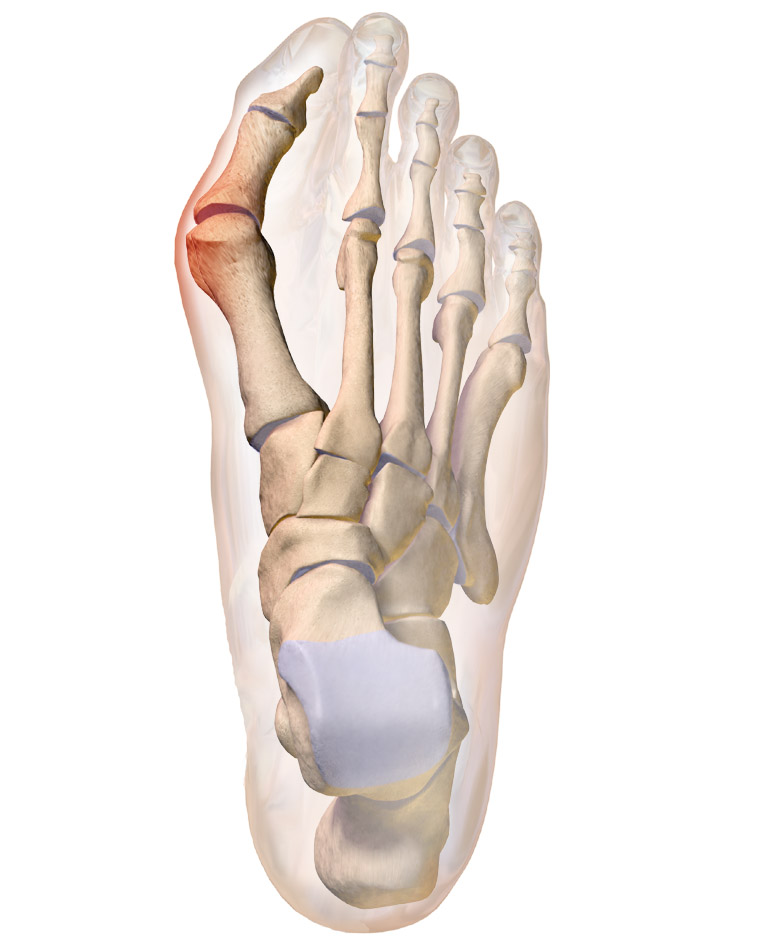
Drawing of a bunion

Symptoms may include irritation of the skin around the bunion, and blisters may form more easily at the site. Pain may be worse when walking.

Bunions can lead to difficulties finding properly fitting footwear and may force a person to buy a larger size shoe to accommodate the width of the bunion. If the bunion deformity becomes severe enough, the foot can hurt in different places even without the constriction of shoes. It is then considered a mechanical function problem of the forefoot.

== Cause ==
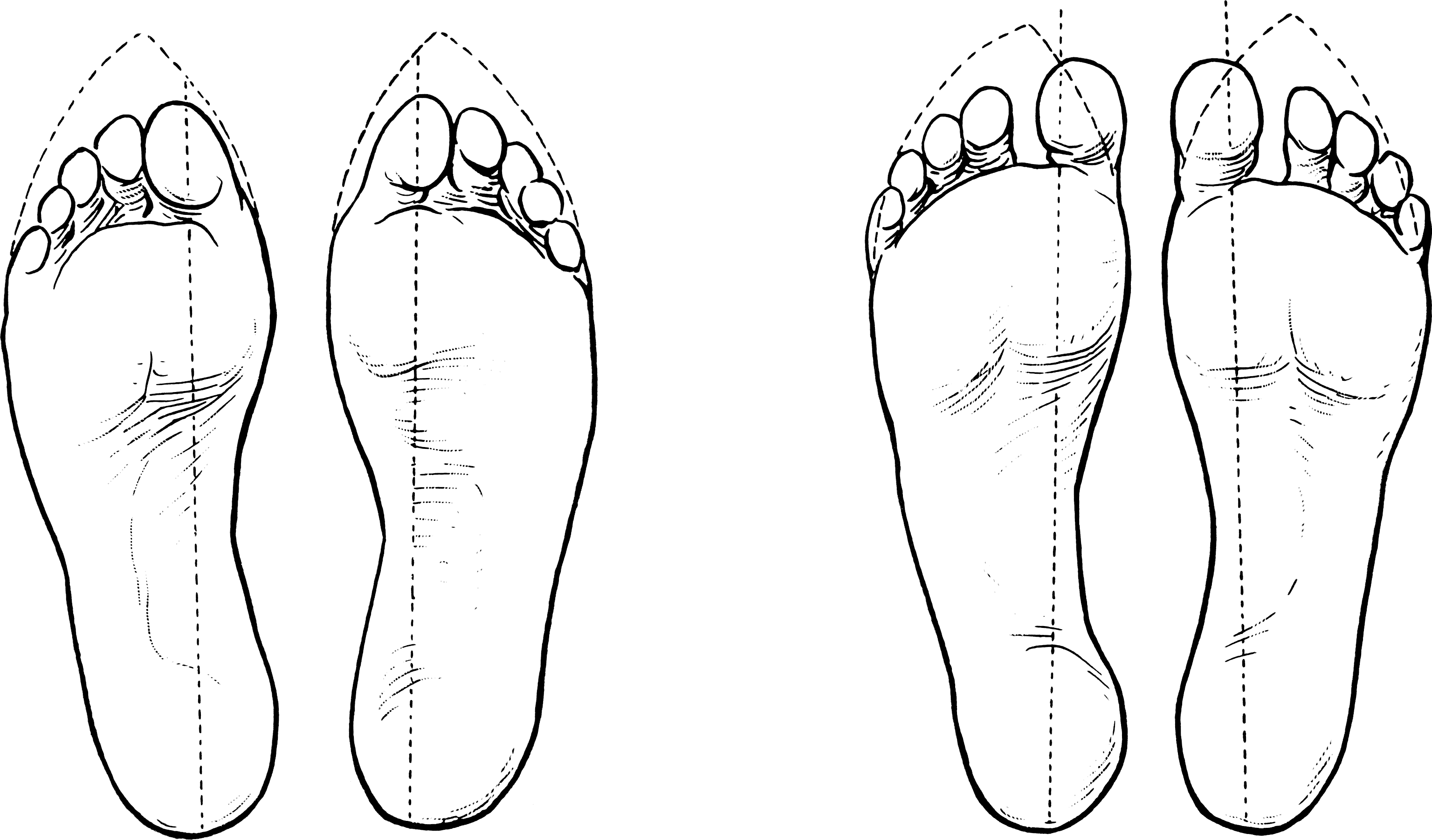
High heels are associated with developing bunions.

The exact cause is unclear. It can be due to a combination of internal and external causes. Proposed factors include wearing overly tight shoes, high-heeled shoes, family history, and rheumatoid arthritis. The American College of Foot and Ankle Surgeons states that footwear only worsens a problem caused by genetics.

Around 50% of adult bunions may have started in childhood. Bunions are significantly more likely to occur in females than males.

Excessive low arch to a flat foot inward ankle pronation of the foot also can cause increased pressure on the inside of the big toe that can result in a deformation of the medial capsular structures of the joint subsequently increasing the risk of developing a bunion.

== Pathophysiology ==
The bump itself is due to the swollen bursal sac or an osseous (bony) anomaly on the metatarsophalangeal joint. The larger part of the bump is a normal part of the head of the first metatarsal bone that has tilted sideways to stick out at its distal (far) end (metatarsus primus varus).

Bunions are commonly associated with a deviated position of the big toe toward the second toe, and the deviation in the angle between the first and second metatarsal bones of the foot. The small sesamoid bones found beneath the first metatarsal (which help the flexor tendon bend the big toe downwards) may also become deviated over time as the first metatarsal bone drifts away from its normal position. Osteoarthritis of the first metatarsophalangeal joint, diminished or altered range of motion, and discomfort with pressure applied to the bump or with motion of the joint, may all accompany bunion development. Atop of the first metatarsal head either medially or dorso-medially, there can also arise a bursa that when inflamed (bursitis), can be the most painful aspect of the process.

== Diagnosis ==
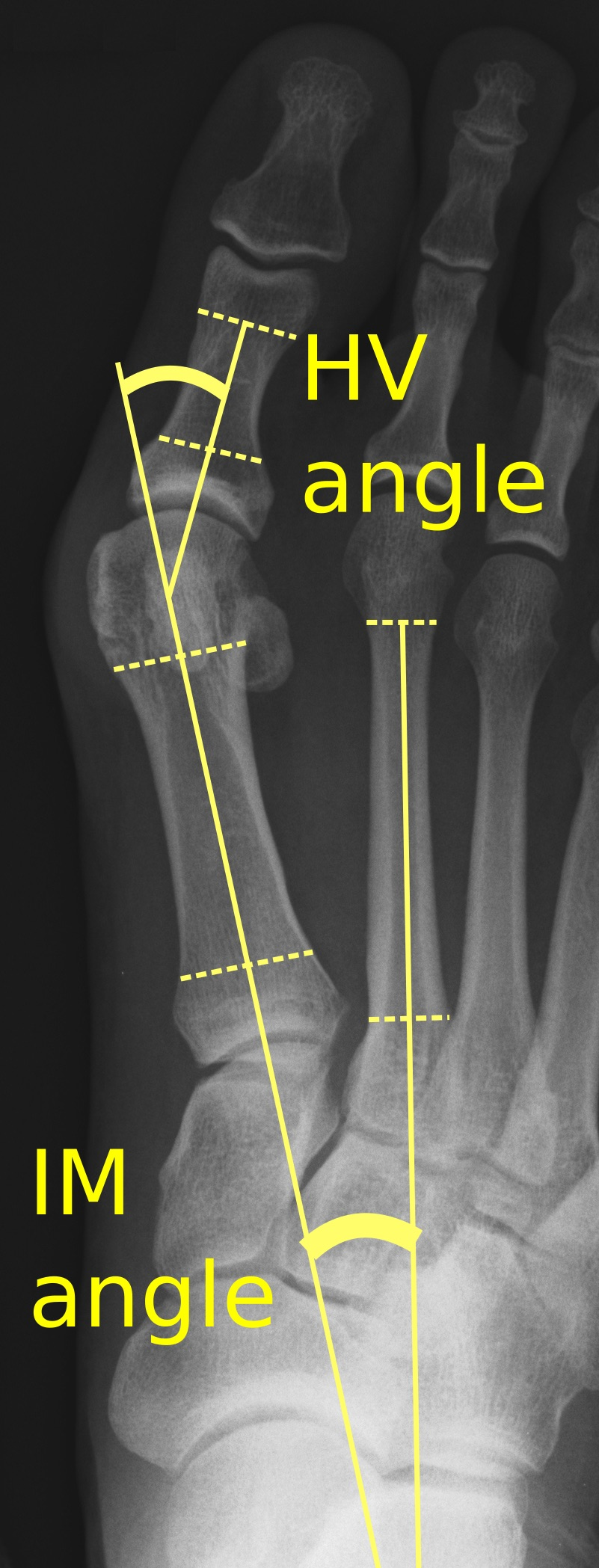
X-ray showing measurements of HV and IM angles of hallux valgus.

Diagnosis is based upon simple viewing of the foot, symptoms of pain, and by X-rays.

Bunions can be diagnosed and analyzed with a simple x-ray, which should be taken with the weight on the foot. The hallux valgus angle (HVA) is the angle between the long axes of the proximal phalanx and the first metatarsal bone of the big toe. It is considered abnormal if greater than 15–18°. The following HV angles can also be used to grade the severity of hallux valgus:

- Mild: 15–20°
- Moderate: 21–39°
- Severe: ≥ 40°

The intermetatarsal angle (IMA) is the angle between the longitudinal axes of the first and second metatarsal bones, and is normally less than 9°. The IM angle can also grade the severity of hallux valgus as:

- Mild: 9–11°
- Moderate: 12–17°
- Severe: ≥ 18°

A 2023 study pointed to an elevated distal metatarsal articular angle as the factor that differentiates pediatric bunions from adults.

== Treatment ==
Conservative treatment for bunions include changes in footwear, the use of orthotics (accommodative padding and shielding), rest, ice, and pain medications such as acetaminophen or nonsteroidal anti-inflammatory drugs. These treatments address symptoms but do not correct the actual deformity. If the discomfort persists and is severe or when aesthetic correction of the deformity is desired, surgical correction by an orthopedic or a podiatric surgeon may be necessary.

Treatment of adolescent onset of bunions has been relatively limited due to lack of understanding of the difference between adult and pediatric bunions. Understanding the difference in causes may guide both choice and timing of treatment. Even if there is early identification of bunions, current surgical corrective treatment typically does not take place until at least skeletal maturity. Ligaments also become less flexible as aging occurs, so waiting before surgical intervention may mean the angle of the bunions will primarily be based on the bones and not due to adolescent flexibility. Waiting for maturity before treatment helps limits the possibility of overcorrecting and can help prevent recurrence since recurrence is relatively high in juvenile bunion cases, and surgical treatment should only be done if there is pain.

=== Orthotics ===
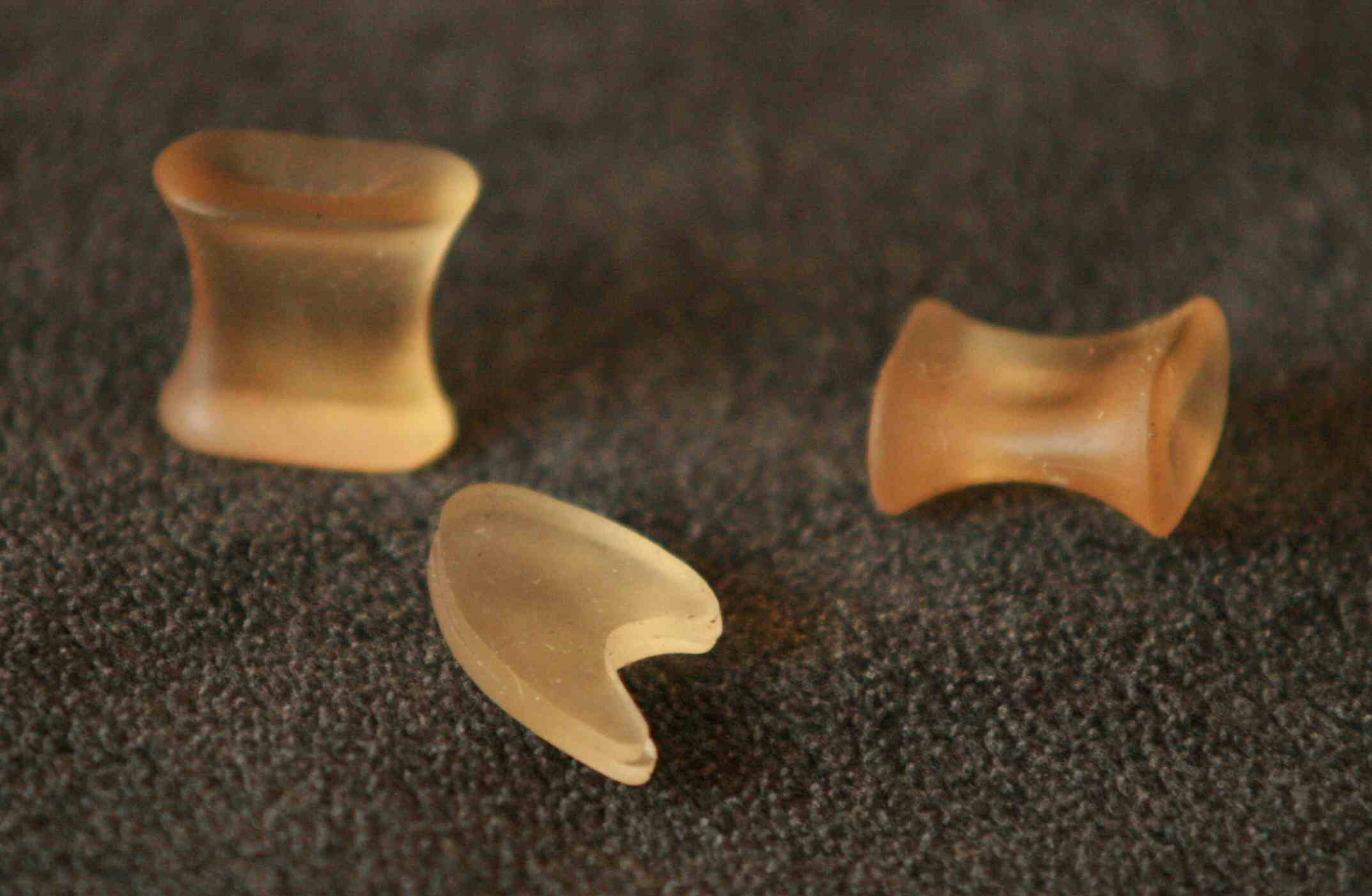
Gel toe spacers come in a variety of sizes and shapes.

Orthotics are splints or regulators while conservative measures include various footwear like toe spacers, valgus splints, and bunion shields. Toe spacers seem to be effective in reducing pain, but there is no evidence that any of these techniques reduces the physical deformity. There are a variety of available orthotics including off-the-shelf commercial products and custom-molded orthotics, which may be prescribed medical devices.

=== Surgery ===
Procedures are designed and chosen to correct a variety of pathologies that may be associated with the bunion. For instance, procedures may address some combination of:

- removing the abnormal bony enlargement of the first metatarsal,
- realigning the first metatarsal bone relative to the adjacent metatarsal bone,
- straightening the great toe relative to the first metatarsal and adjacent toes,
- realigning the cartilaginous surfaces of the great toe joint,
- addressing arthritic changes associated with the great toe joint,
- repositioning the sesamoid bones beneath the first metatarsal bone,
- shortening, lengthening, raising, or lowering the first metatarsal bone,
- correcting any abnormal bowing or misalignment within the great toe,
- connecting two parallel long bones side by side by syndesmosis procedure
- joint fusion, as part of the Lapiplasty system

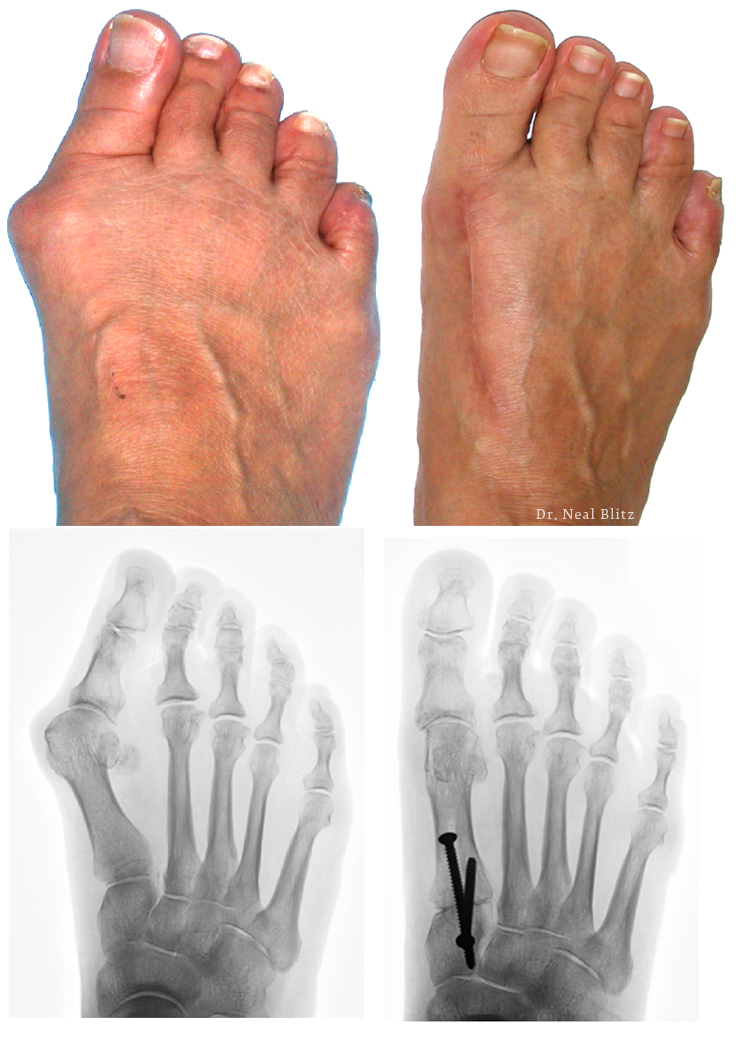
Before and after effects of bunionplasty

At present there are many different bunion surgeries for different effects. The age, health, lifestyle and activity level of the patient may also play a role in the choice of procedure.

Traditional bunion surgery can be performed under local, spinal or general anesthetic. Percutaneous/minimally invasive techniques has been described to be effective for different severities of hallux valgus deformities (bunions). Data from studies using minimally invasive techniques have shorter operating and recovery times as well as increased cosmetic benefit.

A person who has undergone bunion surgery can expect a 6- to 8-week recovery period during which crutches are usually required to aid mobility. An orthopedic cast is much less common today as newer, more stable procedures and better forms of fixation (stabilizing the bone with screws and other hardware) are used. Hardware may even include absorbable pins that perform their function and are then broken down by the body over the course of months.

After recovery, long term stiffness or limited range of motion may occur in some patients. Physical therapy after a surgical intervention, can help restore normal movement of the big toe. Visible or limited scarring may also occur for patients. Recurrence of bunions is a common post-surgical correction with many factors. Compliance with postsurgical instructions may be one of the methods patients can follow to reduce the recurrence.

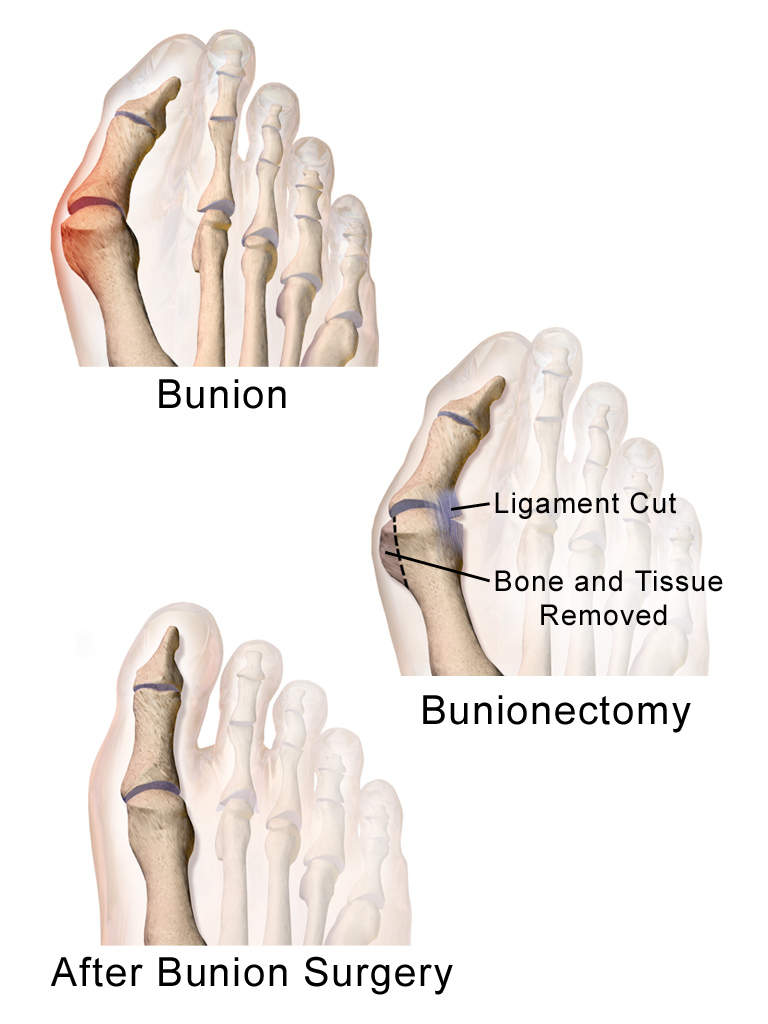
Bunionectomy
