= Treace Medical Concepts =

Treace Medical Concepts, Inc.
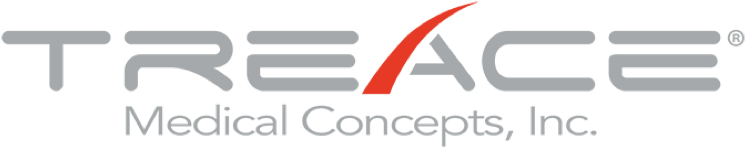
- Type: Public
- Traded as: Nasdaq: TMCI
- Industry: Medical devices
- Founded: 2014; 12 years ago
- Founder: John T. Treace
- Headquarters: Ponte Vedra Beach, Florida, U.S.
- Key people: John T. Treace (CEO); Joe W. Ferguson (COO); James T. Treace (Chairman)
- Products: Foot and ankle surgical devices
- Revenue: ▲US$ 57.365 million (FY2020)
- Operating income: ▲US$ 855 thousand (FY2020)
- Net income: ▲US$ (3.668) million (FY2020)
- Total assets: ▲US$ 41.807 million (FY2020)
- Total equity: ▲US$ 41.807 million (FY2020)
- Number of employees: ▲133 (FY2020)
- Website: treace.com

Treace Medical Concepts, Inc. is a medical device company, headquartered in Ponte Vedra Beach, Florida, specializing in the design, manufacture, and marketing of foot and ankle surgical devices and biologics. Lapiplasty, Treace’s novel primary surgical product, advanced the treatment of bunions, surgically correcting the metatarsal bone, for the first time, in all three dimensions.

In March 2021, Treace announced its intent to launch an initial public offering. Trading on the Nasdaq under the ticker symbol “TMCI”, Treace opened its IPO in April 2021.

== History ==
In mid-2014, John T. Treace invited a number of orthopaedic surgeon designers to Memphis, Tennessee, tasking them to identify the most problematic area of foot and ankle surgery. Each of the five physicians in the group identified the same condition as their top concern, bunions, due to the unreliable nature of traditional lapidus procedures with prolonged recovery times, frequent complications, residual pain, and high rates of recurrence, resulting in an excessively high number of dissatisfied patients.

Several years of research, dating as far back as 1956, combined with new evidence gathered from the introduction of weight-bearing CT capabilities, demonstrated that approximately 85% of bunions involved pronation of the metatarsal in the frontal plane. At the time, however, surgical procedures corrected bunions in the transverse and sagittal planes only, ignoring the abnormal metatarsal pronation. The failure to position the metatarsal into proper frontal plane alignment left the sesamoid position and MTP joint surfaces misaligned, with the joint ultimately remaining non-congruent and with increased stress, resulting in a rate of recurrence as high as 30–50%.

The first Lapidus surgery and instruments to surgically treat bunion abnormalities in all three planes would then be developed by Treace's surgeon advisory group, ultimately leading to the creation of the company’s novel surgical product, Lapiplasty.

=== Initial public offering ===
On March 30, 2021, Treace filed a registration statement with the U.S. Securities and Exchange Commission, advising of its intent to launch an initial public offering of an unknown number of shares, in an attempt to raise up to $100 million in the capital. On April 22, 2021, Treace announced it would upscale its IPO to 11,250,000 aggregate shares, expected to trade under the ticker symbol “TMCI”, at a public offering price of $17.00 per share, with gross proceeds expected to total $106.3 million.

On April 23, 2021, Treace opened its IPO on the Nasdaq 44% higher than anticipated, trading at a price of $24.50 per share.
