= Nutcracker fracture =

Fracture of the cuboid bone of the foot

- Specialty: Orthopedics.

Nutcracker fracture refers to the comminuted fracture of the cuboid bone of the foot. If treated improperly, it can lead to lateral column shortening and significant pain. Nutcracker fracture is rare because of the relatively protected position of cuboid in the midfoot.
