= Plantar metatarsal ligaments =

Ligaments of the foot

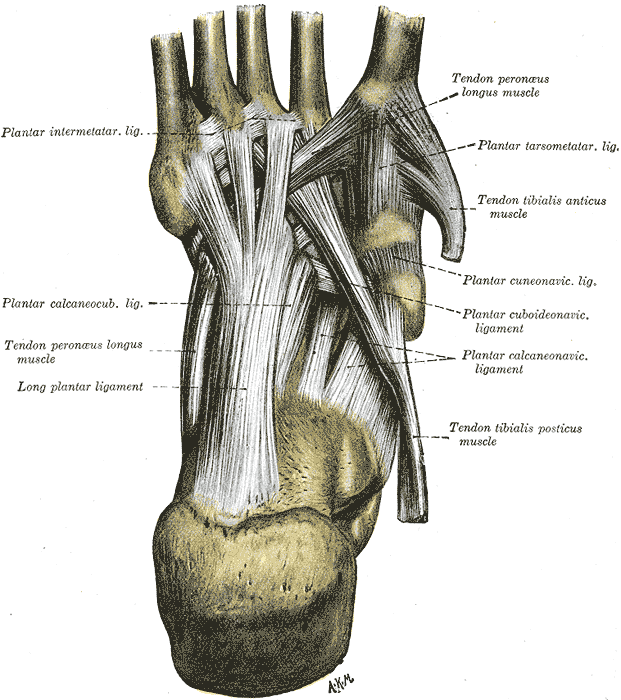
- Ligaments of the sole of the foot, with the tendons of the peronæus longus, tibialis posterior and tibialis anterior muscles.

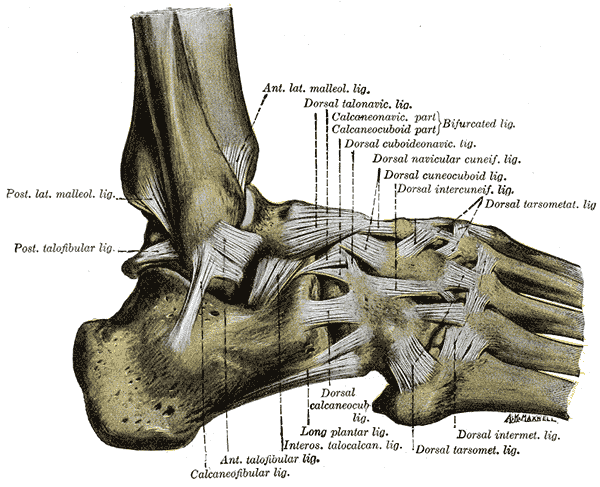
- The ligaments of the foot from the lateral aspect.

Details

Identifiers
- Latin: ligamenta metatarsalia plantaria
- TA98: A03.6.10.704
- TA2: 1962
- FMA: 44427

The plantar metatarsal ligaments are ligaments located on the bottom (plantar) side of the foot. They pass transversely between the plantar side of the bases of adjacent metatarsal bones, similar to the dorsal metatarsal ligaments, helping strengthen the metatarsal joints and prevent bone spreading while pushing on the ground.

More specifically, they connect the plantar aspects of the second to fifth metatarsal bones, excluding the first metatarsal, the big toe. This prevents the metatarsals from spreading under the weight of the body and flattening the foot.

In contrast to the dorsal ligaments, the plantar metatarsal ligaments are stronger and less vulnerable to injury, due to their higher thickness.
