= Dorsal cuneonavicular ligaments =

Ligaments of the foot

Dorsal cuneonavicular ligament

Details
- From: cuneiform
- To: navicular

Identifiers
- Latin: ligamenta navicularicuneiformia dorsalia
- TA98: A03.6.10.514
- TA2: 1942
- FMA: 44239

The dorsal cuneonavicular ligaments consist of fibrous bands that join the dorsal surface of the navicular bone to the dorsal surfaces of the three cuneiform bones.

There are three ligaments which each connect to the dorsum on the corresponding cuneiform bone. The first is the strongest, and the third forms a triangular complex with the dorsal cuneocuboid ligament and dorsal cubonavicular ligament.

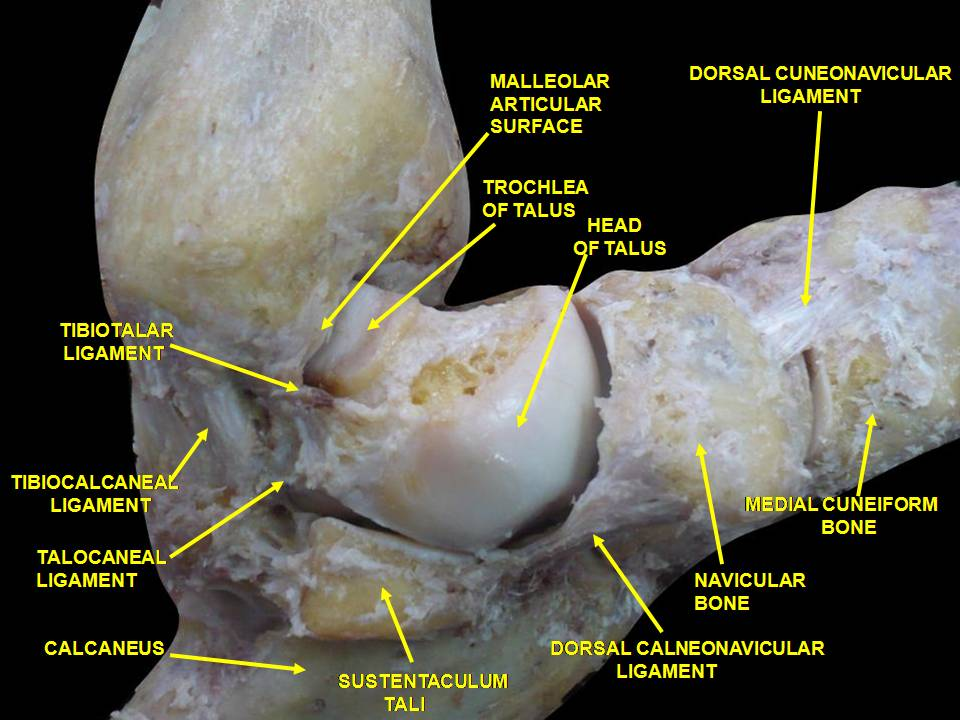
Ankle joint. Deep dissection.

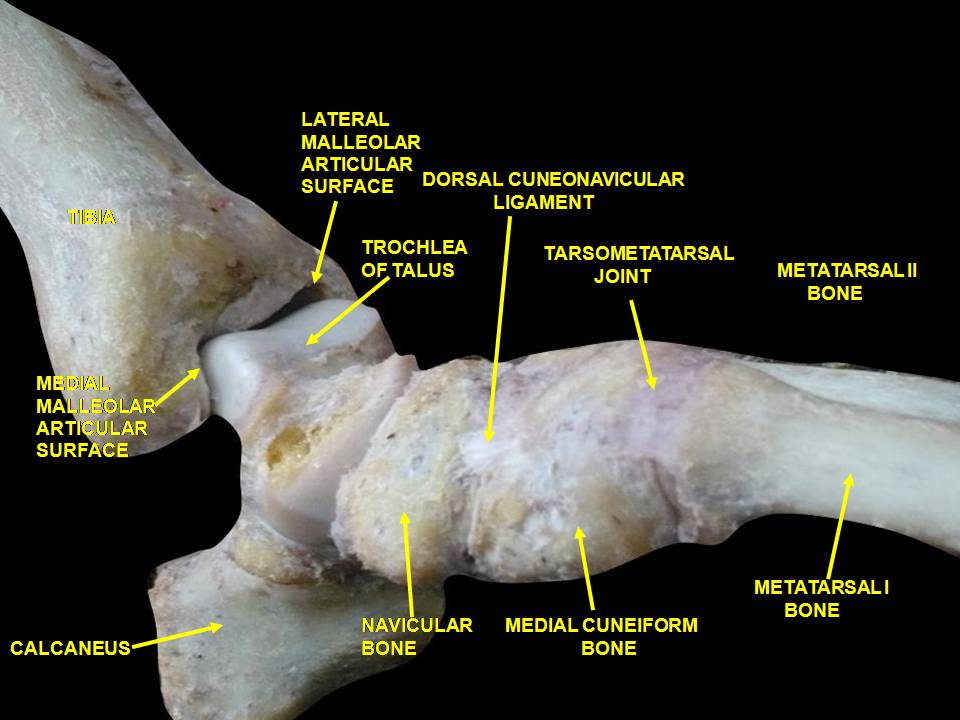
Ankle joint. Deep dissection.
