= Plantar cuneocuboid ligament =

Connects the cuboid with the cuneiform bones

Details
- From: cuneiform
- To: cuboid

Identifiers
- Latin: ligamentum cuneocuboideum plantare
- TA98: A03.6.10.522
- TA2: 1947
- FMA: 44266

The plantar cuneocuboid ligament is a fibrous band that connects the plantar surfaces of the cuboid to the lateral surface of the cuneiform bones.
