= Dorsal cuneocuboid ligament =

Ligament of the foot

Details
- From: cuneiform
- To: cuboid

Identifiers
- Latin: ligamentum cuneocuboideum dorsale
- TA98: A03.6.10.509
- TA2: 1946
- FMA: 44228

The dorsal cuneocuboid ligament consists of fibrous bands that connect the dorsal surfaces of the cuboid and lateral surfaces of the cuneiform bones.
