= Palmar ligament =

A palmar ligament is one of several ligaments in or near the palm of the hand:

- Palmar radiocarpal ligament
- Palmar carpal ligament
- Palmar plate
