= Dorsal tarsometatarsal ligaments =

Ligaments in the foot

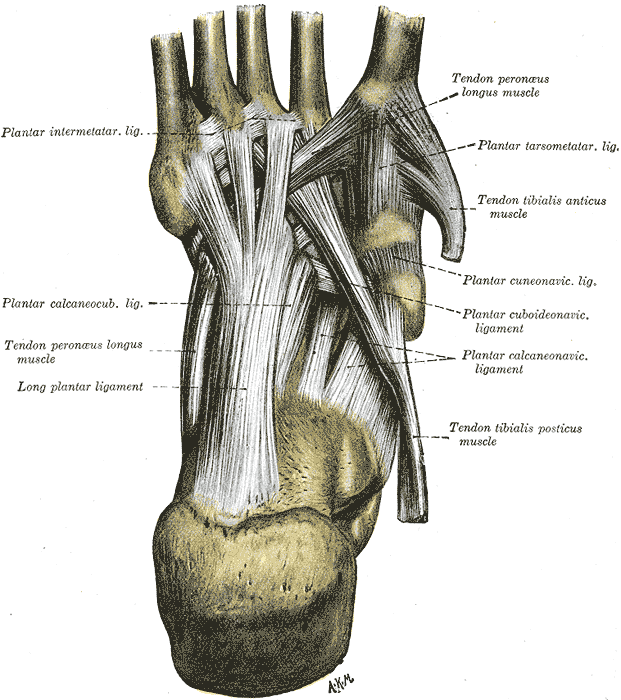
- Ligaments of the sole of the foot, with the tendons of the peroneus longus, tibialis posterior and tibialis anterior muscles

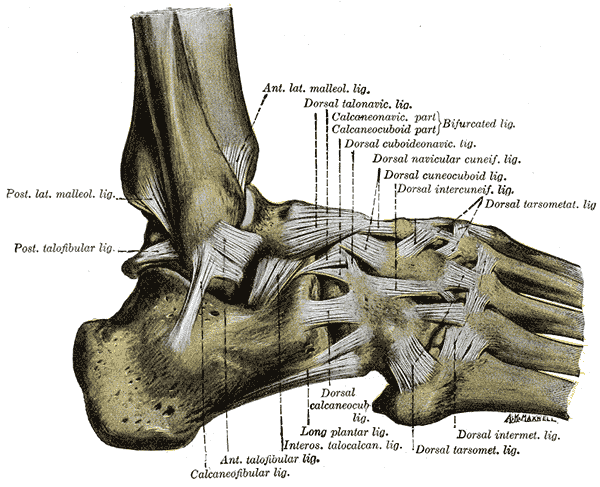
- The ligaments of the foot from the lateral aspect

Details

Identifiers
- Latin: ligamenta tarsometatarsalia dorsalia
- TA98: A03.6.10.602
- TA2: 1956
- FMA: 44270

The dorsal tarsometatarsal ligaments are ligaments in the foot. They are strong, flat bands that stretch from the tarsal bones to the metatarsals.

The first metatarsal is joined to the first cuneiform by a broad, thin band; the second has three, one from each cuneiform bone; the third has one from the third cuneiform; the fourth has one from the third cuneiform and one from the cuboid; and the fifth, one from the cuboid.
