= First metatarsal bone =

Bone in the foot

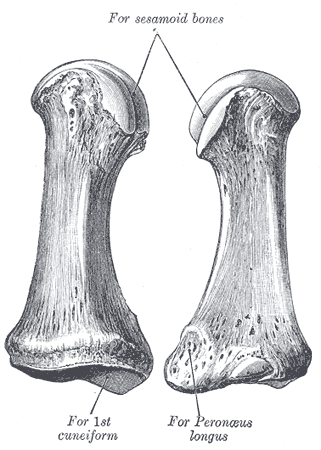
- The first metatarsal. (Left.)

- Bones of the right foot. Dorsal surface. The first metatarsal bone is shown in yellow furthest to the left

Details
- Articulations: Proximal phalange and medial cuneiform

Identifiers
- Latin: os metatarsale I
- TA2: 1500
- FMA: 24502

The first metatarsal bone is the bone in the foot just behind the big toe. The first metatarsal bone is the shortest of the metatarsal bones and by far the thickest and strongest of them.

Like the four other metatarsals, it can be divided into three parts: base, body and head. The base is the part closest to the ankle and the head is closest to the big toe. The narrowed part in the middle is referred to as the body of the bone. The bone is somewhat flattened, giving it two sides: the plantar (towards the sole of the foot) and the dorsal side (the area facing upwards while standing).

The base presents, as a rule, no articular facets (joint surfaces) on its sides, but occasionally on the lateral side there is an oval facet, by which it articulates with the second metatarsal. On the lateral part of the plantar surface there is a rough oval prominence, or tuberosity, for the insertion of the tendon of the fibularis longus.

The first metatarsal articulates (forms joints) with the medial cuneiform and to a small extent with the intermediate cuneiform bone. Its proximal articular surface is large and kidney-shaped. Its circumference is grooved, for the tarsometatarsal ligaments, and medially gives insertion to part of the tendon of the tibialis anterior.

The body of the bone is strong, and of well-marked prismoid form.

The head is large; on its plantar surface are two grooved facets on which the sesamoid bones glide. The facets are separated by a smooth elevation.

== Muscle attachments ==
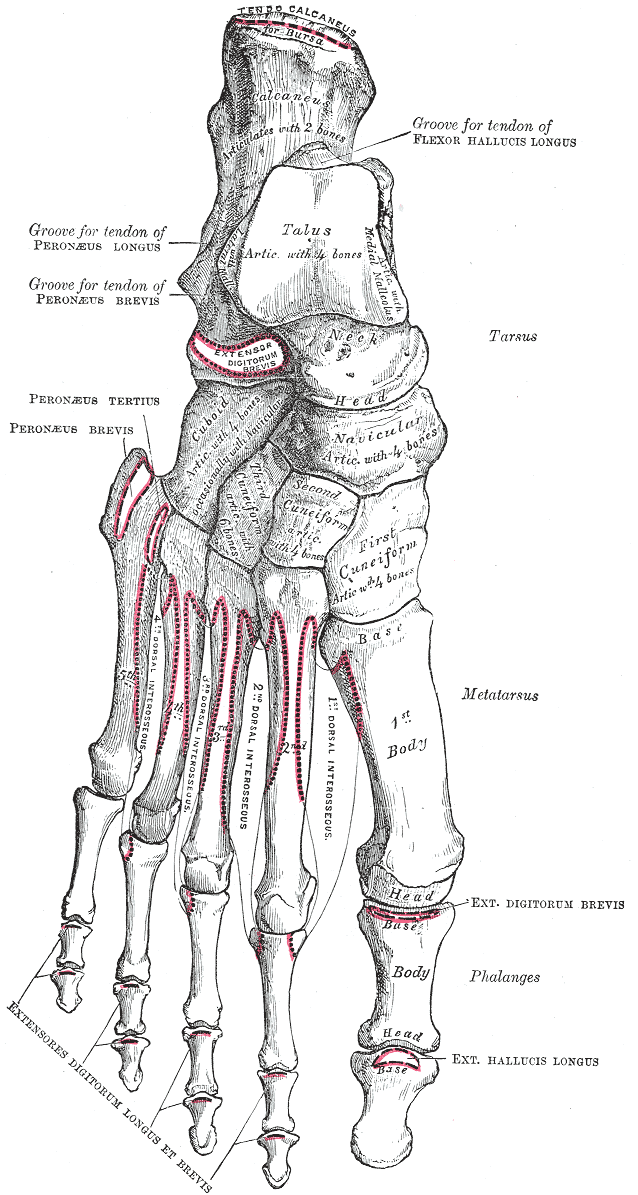
Muscle attachments (seen from above)

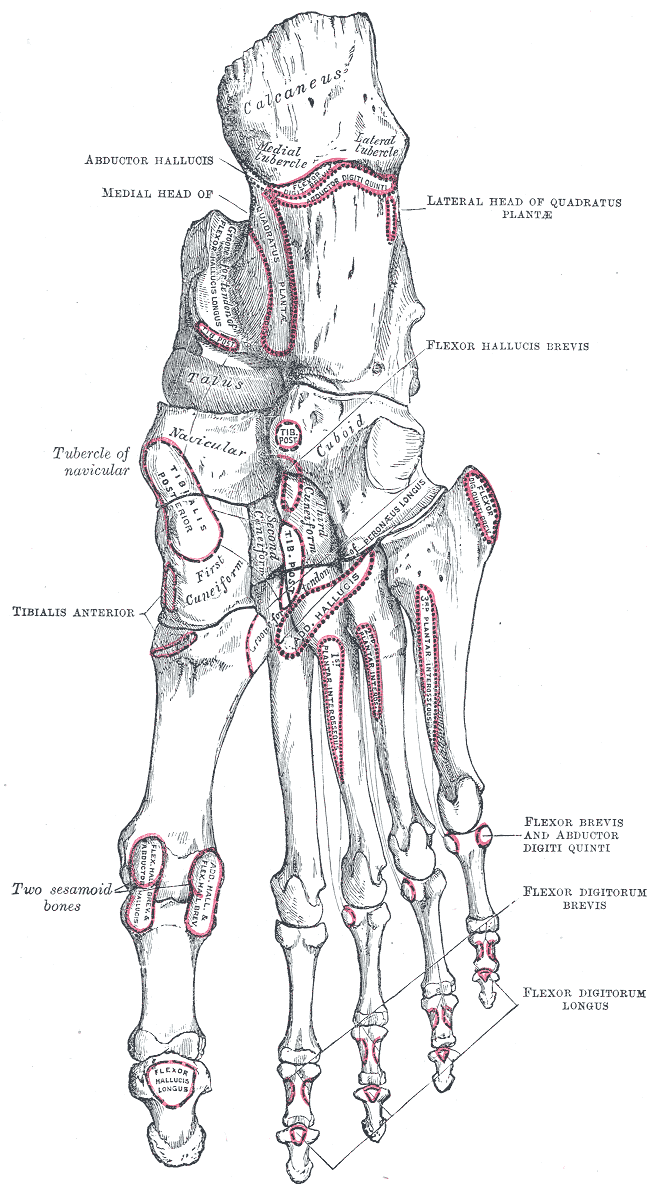
Muscle attachments (seen from below)

Three muscles attach to the first metatarsal bone: the tibialis anterior, fibularis longus and first dorsal interosseus.

The tibialis anterior inserts at the basis of the bone, while the fibularis longus inserts at the tuberosity. The lateral part of the first dorsal interosseus muscle originates from the medial side of the bone. Its function is to spread the toes.

Muscle	Direction	Attachment
Tibialis anterior	Insertion	Basis of first metatarsal
Fibularis longus	Insertion	Tuberosity of first metatarsal
Dorsal interossei I	Origin	Lateral part of first metatarsal

== Additional images ==
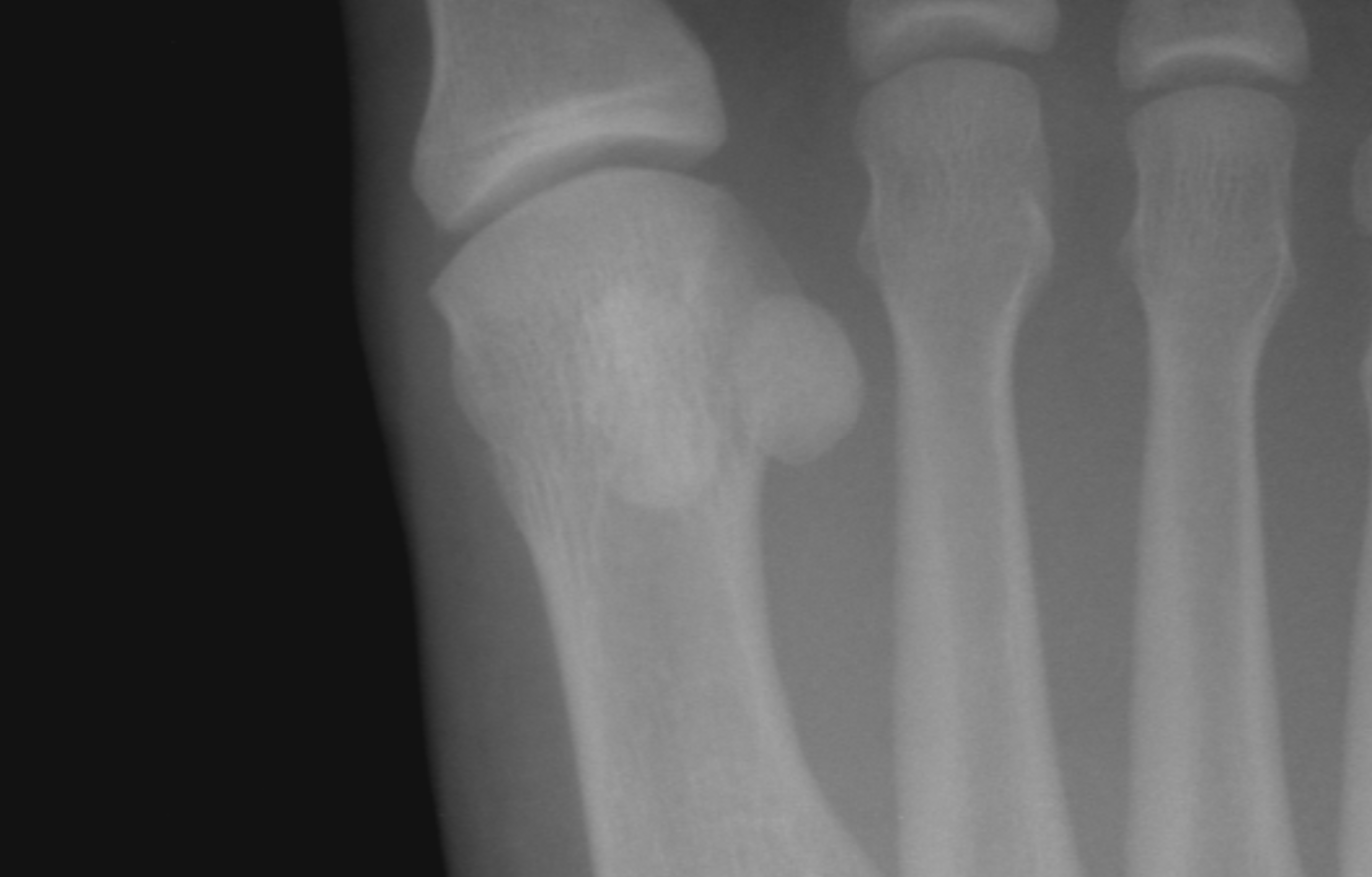
Sesamoid bones at the distal end of the first metatarsal.

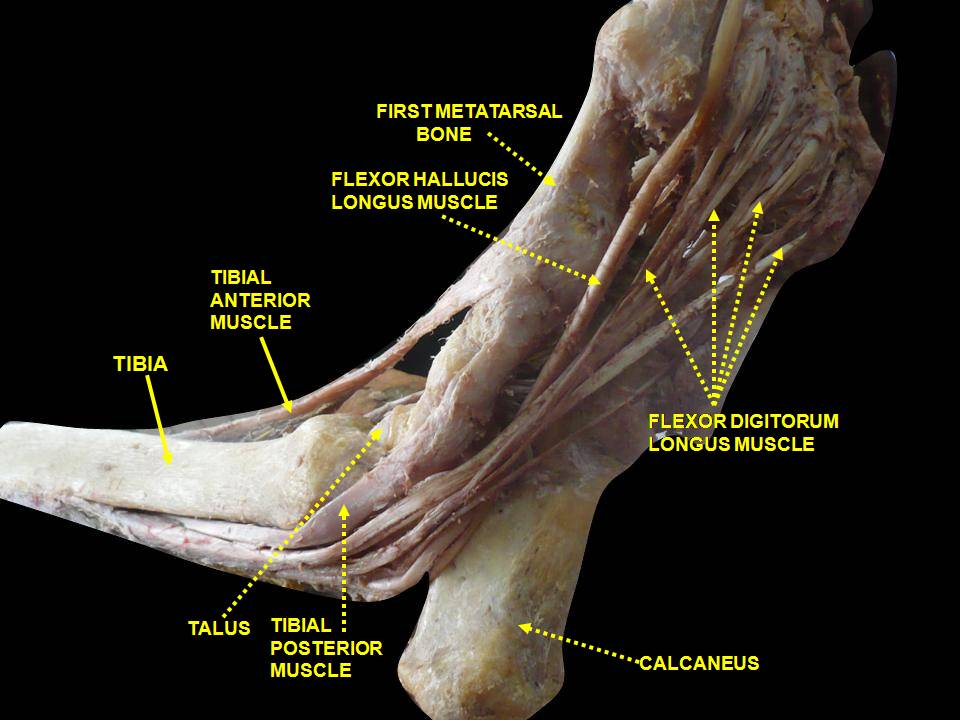
First metatarsal bone. Deep dissection.

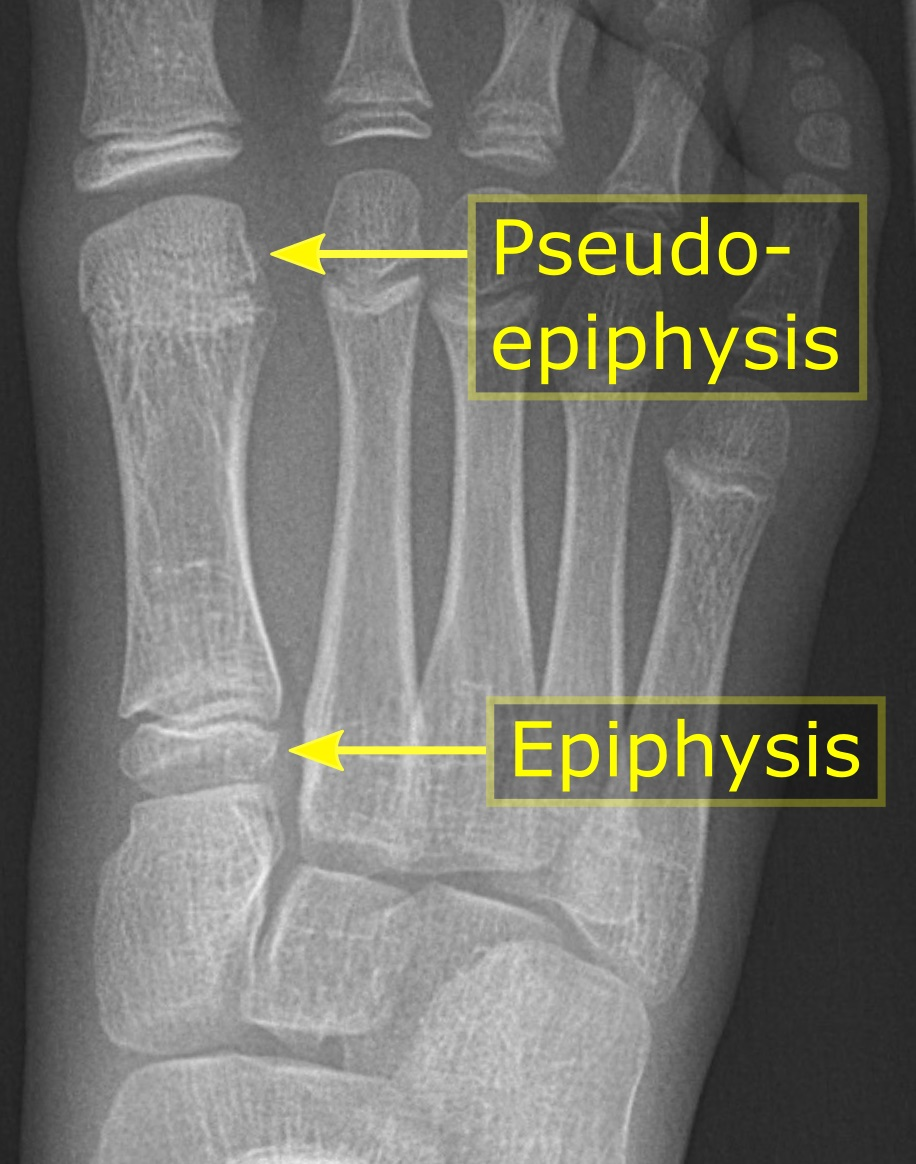
It is common in children to have a pseudo-epiphysis of the first metatarsal.
