= Interosseous metatarsal ligaments =

Ligaments of the foot

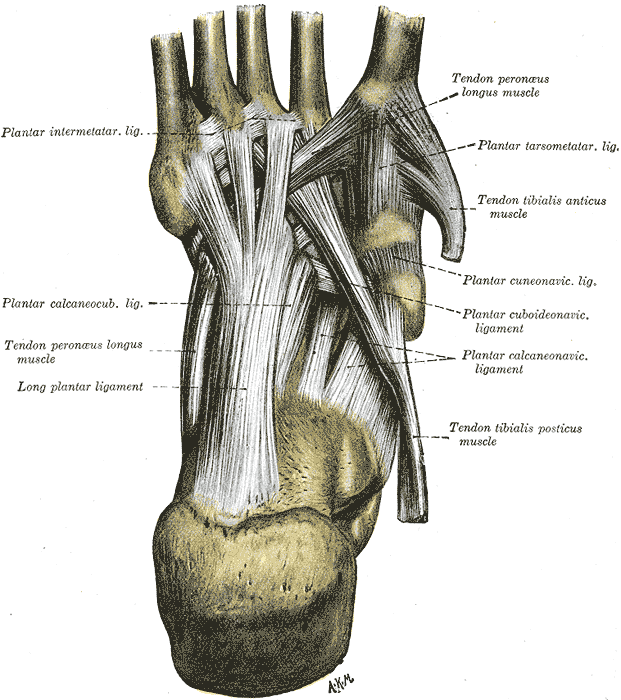
- Ligaments of the sole of the foot, with the tendons of the peronæus longus, tibialis posterior and tibialis anterior muscles.

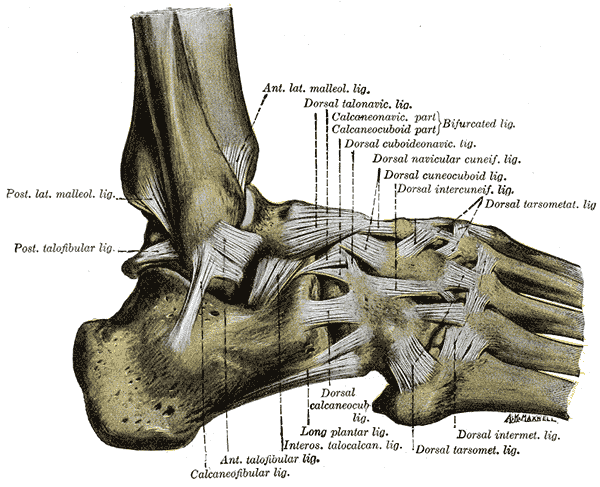
- The ligaments of the foot from the lateral aspect.

Details

Identifiers
- Latin: ligamenta metatarsea interossea
- TA98: A03.6.10.702
- TA2: 1960
- FMA: 71421

The interosseous metatarsal ligaments are ligaments in the foot.
