= Dorsal cuboideonavicular ligament =

Foot ligament

Details
- From: cuboid
- To: navicular

Identifiers
- Latin: ligamentum cuboideonaviculare dorsale
- TA98: A03.6.10.510
- TA2: 1949
- FMA: 44215

The dorsal cuboideonavicular ligament is a fibrous bundle connecting the dorsal surfaces of the cuboid and navicular bones.
