= Plantar cuboideonavicular ligament =

Ligament of the foot

Details
- From: cuboid
- To: navicular

Identifiers
- Latin: ligamentum cuboideonaviculare plantare
- TA98: A03.6.10.520
- TA2: 1950
- FMA: 44260

The plantar cuboideonavicular ligament is a fibrous band that connects the plantar surfaces of the cuboid and navicular bones.
