= Plantar tarsometatarsal ligaments =

Ligaments of the foot

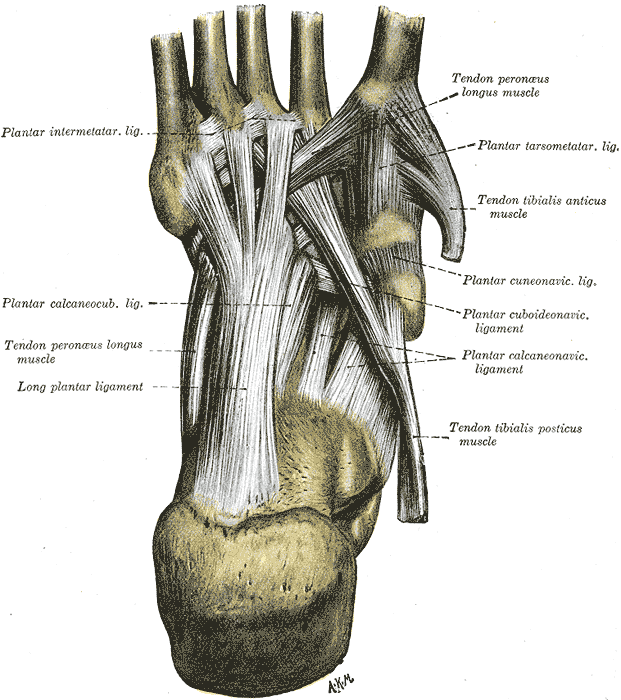
- Ligaments of the sole of the foot, with the tendons of the peronæus longus, tibialis posterior and tibialis anterior muscles.

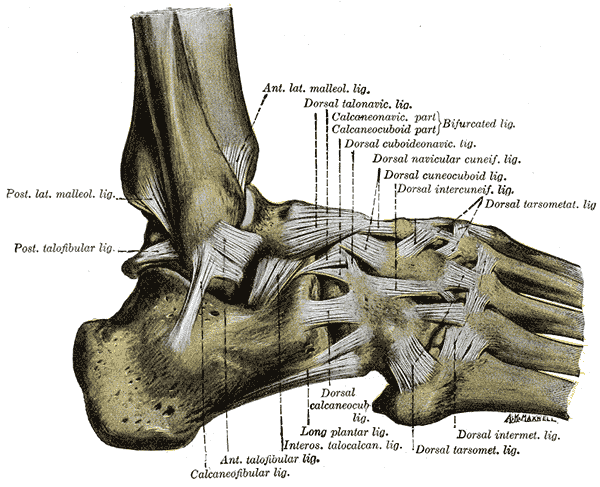
- The ligaments of the foot from the lateral aspect.

Details

Identifiers
- Latin: ligamenta tarsometatarsalia plantaria
- TA98: A03.6.10.603
- TA2: 1957
- FMA: 44271

The plantar tarsometatarsal ligaments consist of longitudinal and oblique bands, disposed with less regularity than the dorsal ligaments.

Those for the first and second metatarsals are the strongest; the second and third metatarsals are joined by oblique bands to the first cuneiform; the fourth and fifth metatarsals are connected by a few fibers to the cuboid.
