= Interosseous intercuneiform ligaments =

Ligaments of the foot

Details
- From: cuneiform
- To: cuneiform

Identifiers
- Latin: ligamenta intercuneiformia interossea
- TA98: A03.6.10.505
- TA2: 1952
- FMA: 44207 71413, 44207

The interosseous intercuneiform ligaments are short fibrous bands that connect the adjacent surfaces of the medial and intermediate, and the intermediate and lateral cuneiform bones. It is one of the 3 ligaments responsible for maintaining the transverse arch of the foot together with the interosseous ligaments of metatarsals and the transverse metatarsal ligament.
