= Dorsal metatarsal ligaments =

Ligaments of the foot

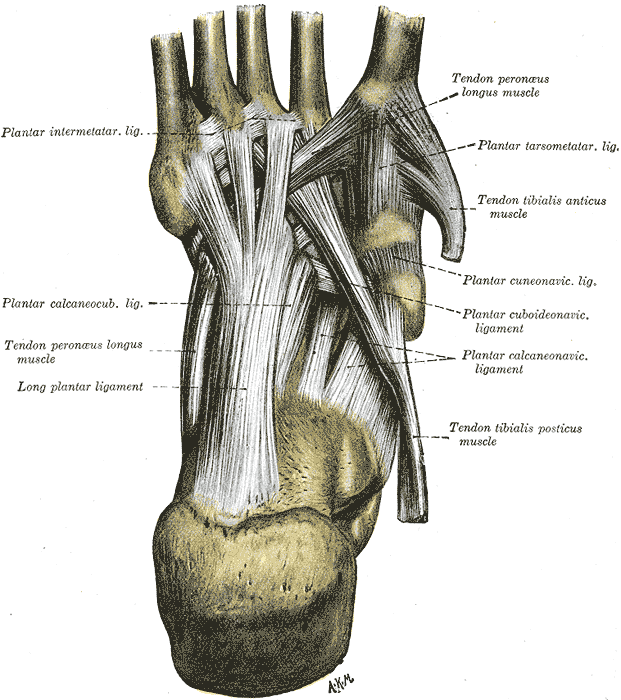
- Ligaments of the sole of the foot, with the tendons of the peronæus longus, tibialis posterior and tibialis anterior muscles.

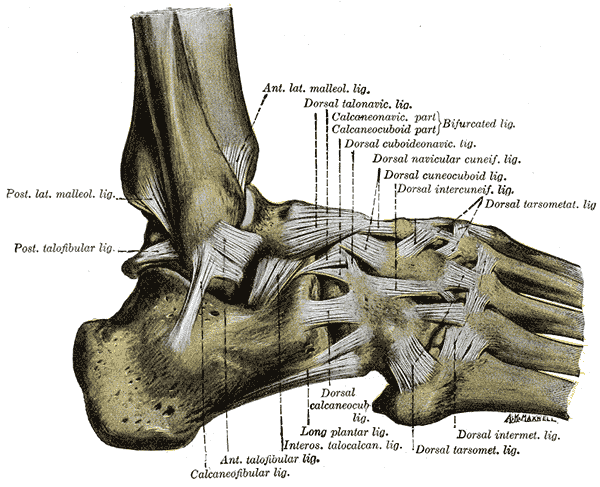
- The ligaments of the foot from the lateral aspect.

Details

Identifiers
- Latin: ligamenta metatarsalia dorsalia
- TA98: A03.6.10.703
- TA2: 1961
- FMA: 44426

The dorsal metatarsal ligaments are ligaments in the foot.
