= Dorsal intercuneiform ligaments =

Ligaments of the foot

Details
- From: cuneiform
- To: cuneiform

Identifiers
- Latin: ligamenta intercuneiformia dorsalia
- TA98: A03.6.10.508
- TA2: 1953
- FMA: 44214

The dorsal intercuneiform ligaments are fibrous bands that connect the dorsal surfaces of the three cuneiform bones.
