= Plantar cuneonavicular ligaments =

Ligaments of the foot

Details
- From: cuneiform
- To: navicular

Identifiers
- Latin: ligamenta cuneonavicularia plantaria
- TA98: A03.6.10.519
- TA2: 1943
- FMA: 44257

The plantar cuneonavicular ligaments are fibrous bands that connect the plantar surface of the navicular bone to the adjacent plantar surfaces of the three cuneiform bones.
