= Plantar intercuneiform ligaments =

Foot ligament

Details
- From: cuneiform
- To: cuneiform

Identifiers
- Latin: ligamenta intercuneiformia plantaria
- TA98: A03.6.10.521
- TA2: 1954
- FMA: 44263

The plantar intercuneiform ligaments are fibrous bands that connect the plantar surfaces of adjacent cuneiform bones in the foot.
