= Great tarsal synovial membrane =

Connective tissue of the foot

The great tarsal synovial membrane is a synovial membrane in the foot. The synovial membranes between the second and third, and the third and fourth metatarsal bones are part of the great tarsal synovial membrane; that between the fourth and fifth metatarsal bones is a prolongation of the synovial membrane of the cuboideometatarsal joint.
