= Cuboid bone =

Bone of the ankle

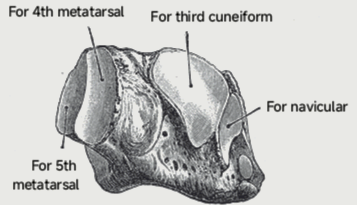
- The right cuboid. Antero-medial view. (From Gray's Anatomy.)

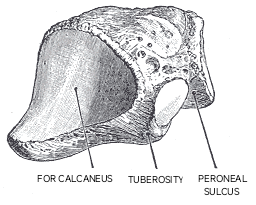
- The right cuboid. Postero-lateral view. (From Gray's Anatomy.)

Details
- Articulations: Calcaneocuboid, cuboideonavicular and cuneocuboid articulation

Identifiers
- Latin: os cuboideum
- TA98: A02.5.16.001
- TA2: 1489
- FMA: 24527

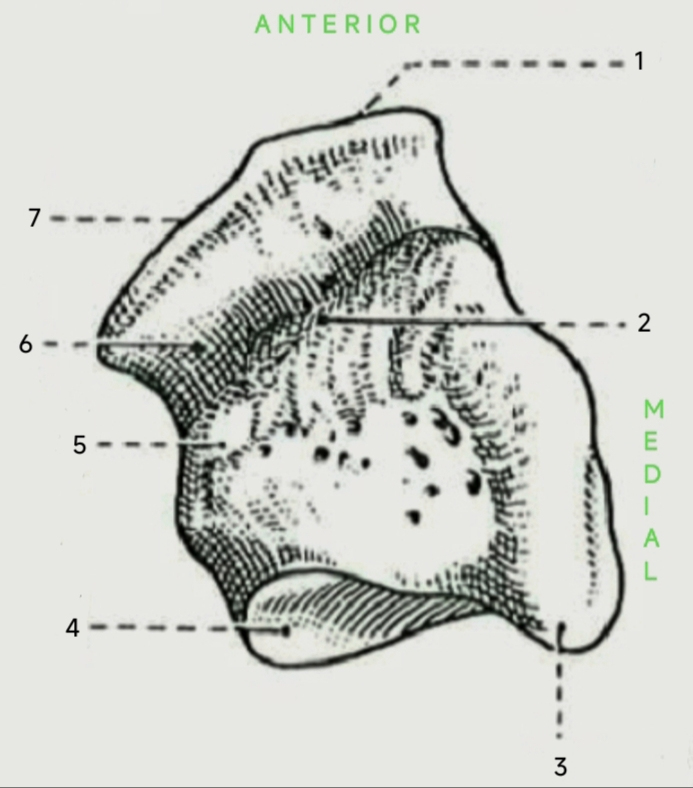
The right cuboid. Inferior view. (After Charpy.)

In the human body, the cuboid bone is one of the seven tarsal bones of the foot.

== Structure ==
The cuboid bone is the most lateral of the bones in the distal row of the tarsus. It is roughly cubical in shape, and presents a prominence in its inferior (or plantar) surface, the tuberosity of the cuboid. The bone provides a groove where the tendon of the peroneus longus muscle passes to reach its insertion in the first metatarsal and medial cuneiform bones.

=== Surfaces ===
The dorsal surface, directed upward and lateralward, is rough, for the attachment of ligaments.

The plantar surface presents in front a deep groove, the peroneal sulcus, which runs obliquely forward and medialward; it lodges the tendon of the peroneus longus, and is bounded behind by a prominent ridge, to which the long plantar ligament is attached.

The ridge ends laterally in an eminence, the tuberosity, the surface of which presents an oval facet; on this facet glides the sesamoid bone or cartilage frequently found in the tendon of the peroneus longus. The surface of bone behind the groove is rough, for the attachment of the plantar calcaneocuboid ligament, a few fibers of the flexor hallucis brevis, and a fasciculus from the tendon of the tibialis posterior.

The lateral surface presents a deep notch formed by the commencement of the peroneal sulcus.

The posterior surface is smooth, triangular, and concavo-convex, for articulation with the anterior surface of the calcaneus (the calcaneocuboid joint); its infero-medial angle projects backward as a process which underlies and supports the anterior end of the calcaneus.

The anterior surface, of smaller size, but also irregularly triangular, is divided by a vertical ridge into two facets, forming the fourth and fifth tarsometatarsal joints: the medial facet, quadrilateral in form, articulates with the fourth metatarsal; the lateral, larger and more triangular, articulates with the fifth.

The medial surface is broad, irregularly quadrilateral, and presents at its middle and upper part a smooth oval facet, for articulation with the third cuneiform; and behind this (occasionally) a smaller facet, for articulation with the navicular bone; it is rough in the rest of its extent, for the attachment of strong interosseous ligaments.

=== Muscle attachments ===
Only one muscle is attached to the cuboid bone; the tibialis posterior. The tibialis posterior inserts to the under surface of the cuboid bone. While the flexor hallucis brevis arises, by a pointed tendinous process, from the medial part of the under surface of the cuboid bone, from the contiguous portion of the lateral cuneiform bone, and from the prolongation of the tendon of the tibialis posterior.

== Clinical significance ==
In a condition known as cuboid syndrome, the cuboid can be subluxated downward causing a swollen kind of ache along the central portion of the lateral border of the foot.

== See also ==
- Bone terminology
- Cuboid fracture
- Knucklebones (precursor of gaming dice)
- Nutcracker fracture
- Terms for anatomical location
