= Interosseous cuneometatarsal ligaments =

Ligaments of the foot

Details
- From: cuneiform
- To: metatarsal

Identifiers
- Latin: ligamenta cuneometatarsea interossea
- TA98: A03.6.10.604
- TA2: 1958
- FMA: 44272

The interosseous cuneometatarsal ligaments are fibrous bands that connect the adjacent surfaces of the cuneiform and the metatarsal bones.
