= Dorsal interossei =

Dorsal interossei (Latin: interossei dorsales) may refer to:

- Dorsal interossei of the hand, musculi interossei dorsales manus
- Dorsal interossei of the foot, musculi interossei dorsales pedis
