= Surfer's knots =

Surfer's knots are a cutaneous condition caused by chronic pressure over bony prominences leading to thick fibrotic nodules on knees, knuckles, dorsal feet, often seen with those who perform surfing, boxing, football, and marbles.

== See also ==
- Turf toe
- Tennis toe
- List of cutaneous conditions
