= Toe box =

Part of a shoe

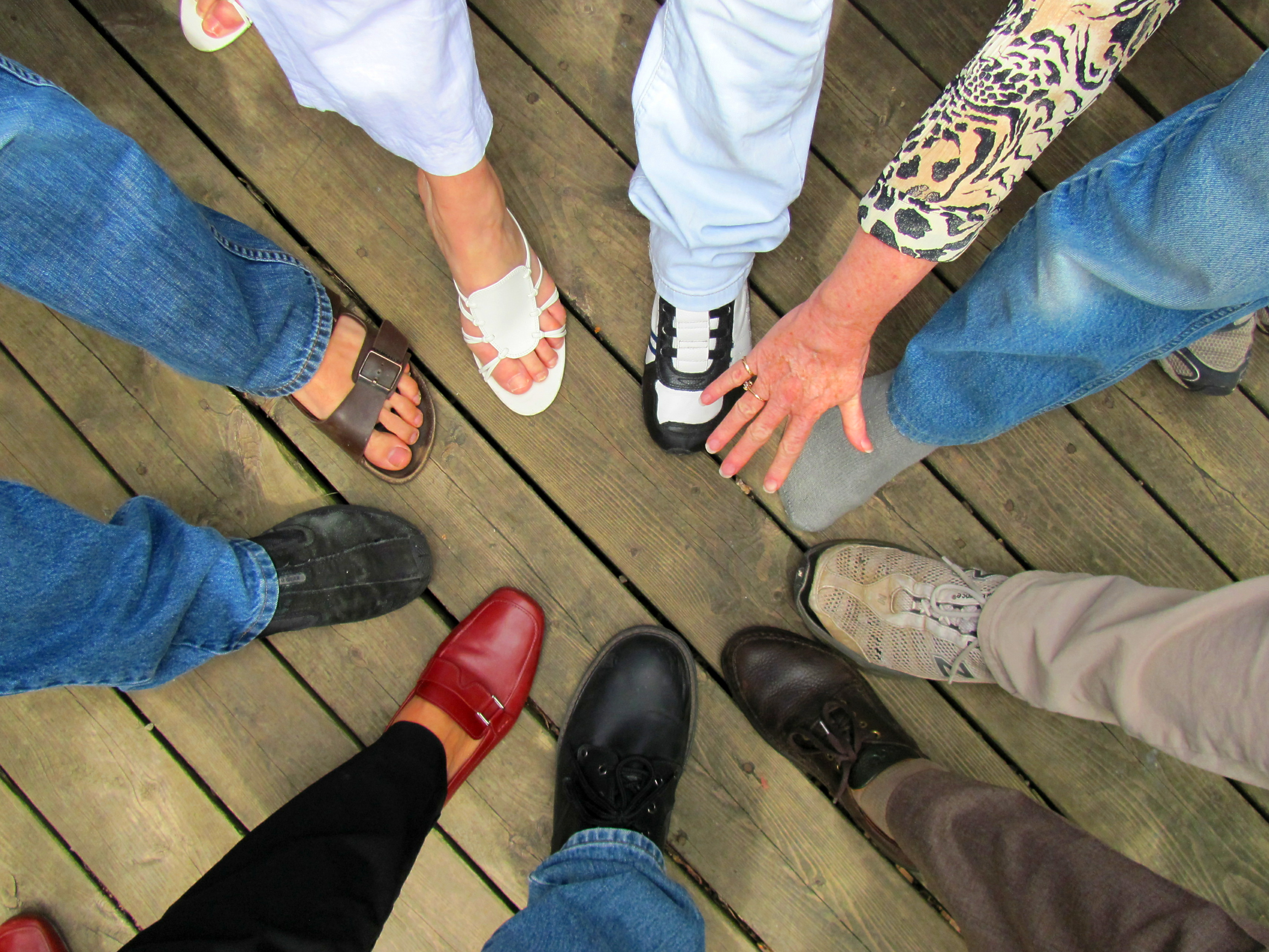
Shoes with a variety of toe boxes

The toe box is the section of footwear that surrounds the toes on closed-toe shoes. Toe boxes that are too tight can cause injuries and foot deformities, whereas wider toe boxes may be used to treat or prevent common foot conditions such as broken toes, bunions, and Morton's neuroma. Toe boxes come in a variety of shapes and styles of construction, some of which are a matter of fashion, and some of which are designed for specialized functions.

== Fitting ==
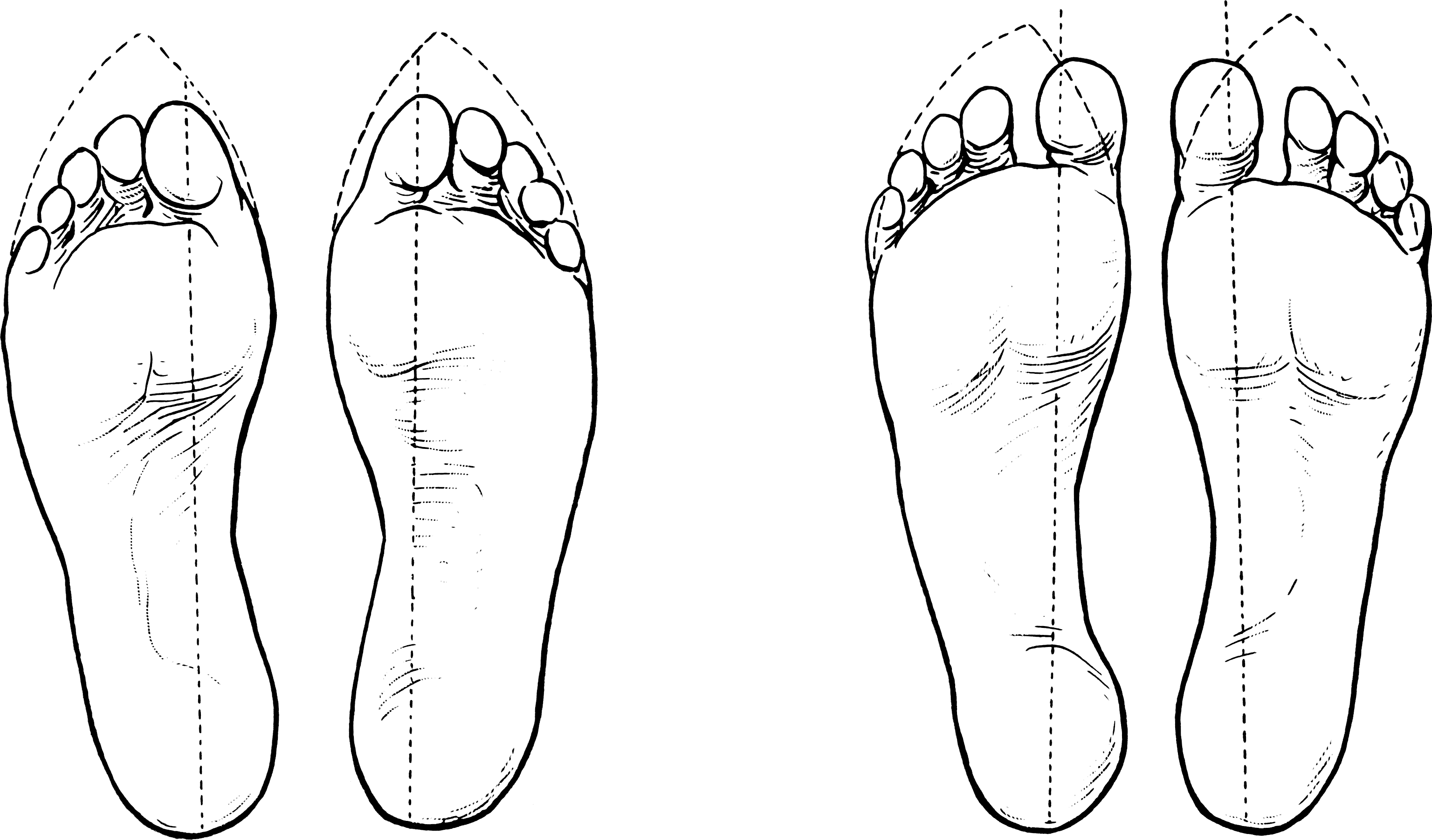
If the toes overhang when standing on the removed insole (right), then they will be cramped inside the toe box (left)

The toe box of a shoe should fit the wearer's foot without cramping or compressing it. A simple way to test if a toe box is too tight is to take out the insole of the shoe and stand on it. If the toes overhang the insole, the toe box is too small for the foot.

The toe box also needs enough extra room to accommodate movements of the foot, such as lengthening arches and the splay of the toes. With each step, ankles and feet bend, toes spread and flex, and the arches of the foot flatten and rebound. Because the arches flatten, the foot lengthens and widens as it takes weight. Weight-bearing causes the foot to widen across the ball by up to 0.5 inches (1.3 cm). A foot with a higher longitudinal arch will lengthen more in use, and more room in front of the toes may be needed.

When running, weight is shifted onto the ball and toes of the foot, with the heel barely touching the ground. A narrow toe box therefore hinders running more than it does walking.

High heels also shift weigh onto the toes. Even a heel less than 2 centimetres (0.79 in) tall can increase pressure on the toes by over 20%.

== Issues caused by poorly-fitting toe boxes ==
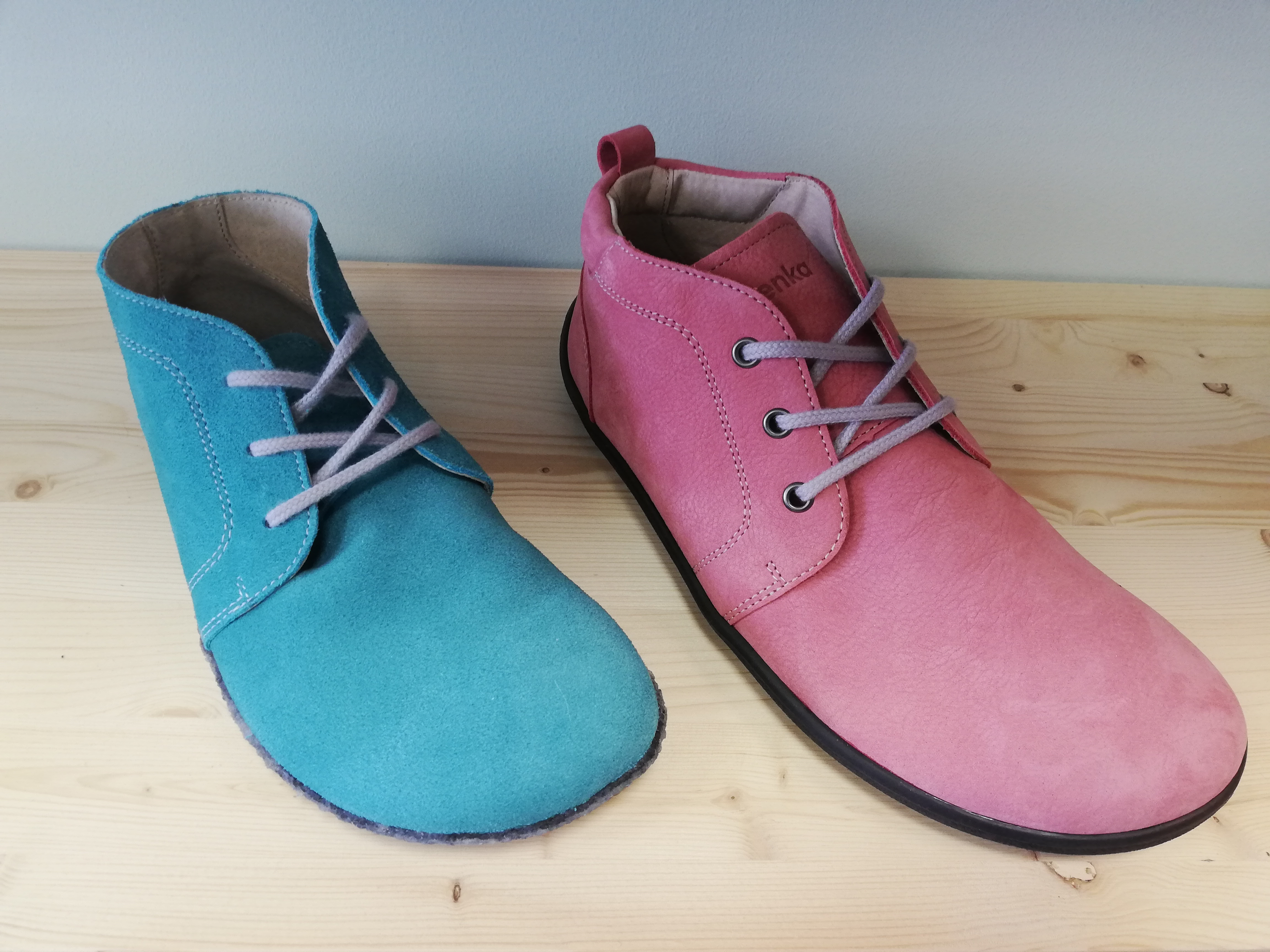
Roomy toe boxes

Generally, toes should not touch the toe box itself, at the end or at the sides. Toe boxes that put pressure on the foot slowly produce permanent deformities; toe boxes that strike the toes cause bruising; and toe boxes that rub hurt the skin.

Narrowed toe boxes may also be linked to metatarsalgia (pain in the midfoot), metatarsal stress fracture, Haglund syndrome, Freiberg infraction, and Morton's neuroma. They can also aggravate bursitis.

=== Joint deformities ===
Too-tight toe boxes can permanently deform the foot, weakening it enough to significantly impair function. Tight socks can have similar effects, especially if the foot is already fairly deformed.

Roomy toe boxes which permit free movement help, with improvement of deformities of the foot depending on the degree of severity and duration of the deformity, and the age of the patient. If too-narrow and too-short toe boxes have previously been worn, the muscles of the arches will be weaker; the foot may expand more, and the muscles may feel tired and painful until they strengthen. Foot exercise and broader shoes tend to thicken and widen the foot; a re-fitting after six months may be needed, although after that the shoe size of adults generally stabilizes.

==== Bunions ====
Shoes which put pressure on the outside edge of the big toe cause bunion (bending of the big toe sideways towards the other toes). Bunion prevention requires a shoe with a sole which does not taper on that side, so that the big toe can point in its natural direction. Any material bunion deformity appreciably weakens the foot; the sideways shift in the big toe decreases leverage and shifts weight-bearing. However, this deformity is very common.

A bunionette, a similar inwards bending of the little toe, is caused by a too-narrow toe box which puts pressure on the other side of the toes; it is not uncommon, but generally causes less impairment, as the little toe is less mechanically important.

The 1993 American Orthopaedic Foot and Ankle Society Women's Shoe Survey found that women who wore shoes no more than 0.5 cm narrower than their feet (12% of those surveyed) very rarely had foot pain and had less foot deformity than the average woman (who wore shoes 1.2 cm narrower than her foot). Of women who wore shoes that were more than 0.5 cm narrower than their feet, 80% had foot pain and 73 percent were orthopaedic patients. Women over 50 who remember wearing narrow toe boxes in their 20s and 30s are more likely to have foot pain and bunions.

Severe bunions can develop into crossover toes, where the toes overlap. Crossover toes are initially flexible, and can be uncrossed with the fingers, but spring back. If left, eventually the soft tissue scars and tightens, and it becomes impossible to uncross the toes.

==== Hammertoes ====
Tight toe boxes are the most common cause of hammertoes, mallet toes and claw toes. A too-small toe box forces the toes to bend; eventually, the ligaments shorten, the joint capsule tightens, and the toes no longer relax to a straight position when taken out of the shoes. If the ligaments continue to tighten, it may become impossible to straighten the toes.

Wearing wide, roomy toe boxes which are longer than the longest toe, and are not tight or painful anywhere, prevents and treats hammertoes. High heels can force the toes forwards against the ends of the toe box, and should also be avoided (both to prevent hammertoes and to treat them). Shoes should fasten such that the toes do not slide into a collision with the end of the toe box, especially when walking downhill.

=== Skin and nail problems ===
Right column: the shoe is loose, and when walking, particularly downhill, the foot slides back and forth within the shoe.; Center: there is too little ease for arches to extend when walking, and the shoe is too tight.; Left: a properly-fitting shoe.

==== Blisters and calluses ====
Ill-fitting toe boxes can rub against the foot, causing blisters, and eventually calluses and corns. These often occur on the toes and the balls of the foot. Foot deformation and dysfunction can encourage calluses to form.

==== Jogger's toes ====
If the toe box does not have enough room around the toes, or the foot can slide forwards far enough to jam the toes into the end of the toe box, it can also cause black toenail (also known as jogger's toe). The toes also need vertical space; a toe cap which is low enough to press on the top of the toe may also cause bruising under the nail, especially if the toe cap is stiff. If the toe box is pointed, the toes may be wedged forwards into the area with inadequate height.

==== Ingrown toenails ====
Narrow pointed shoes (or tight socks) can be a factor in causing ingrown toenails.

== Vertical profile ==
Toe boxes are either structured (with a three-dimensional shape, often produced with a thermoplastic interlayer) or unstructured. Structuring mostly affects the depth of the toe box. Some moccasins have wide, unstructured toe boxes, somewhat loose on the foot, which allow toe splay. Many toe boxes also include toe spring, where the sole curves up towards the toes. When the shoe is flexible enough to bend with the foot, at the ball of the foot, this is not needed. Most toe boxes, at a point 5 cm (2.0 in) from the tip, are roughly 44 mm (1.7 in) deep, regardless of style. Especially wide and deep toe boxes may be used to provide space for foot deformities and foot orthotics.

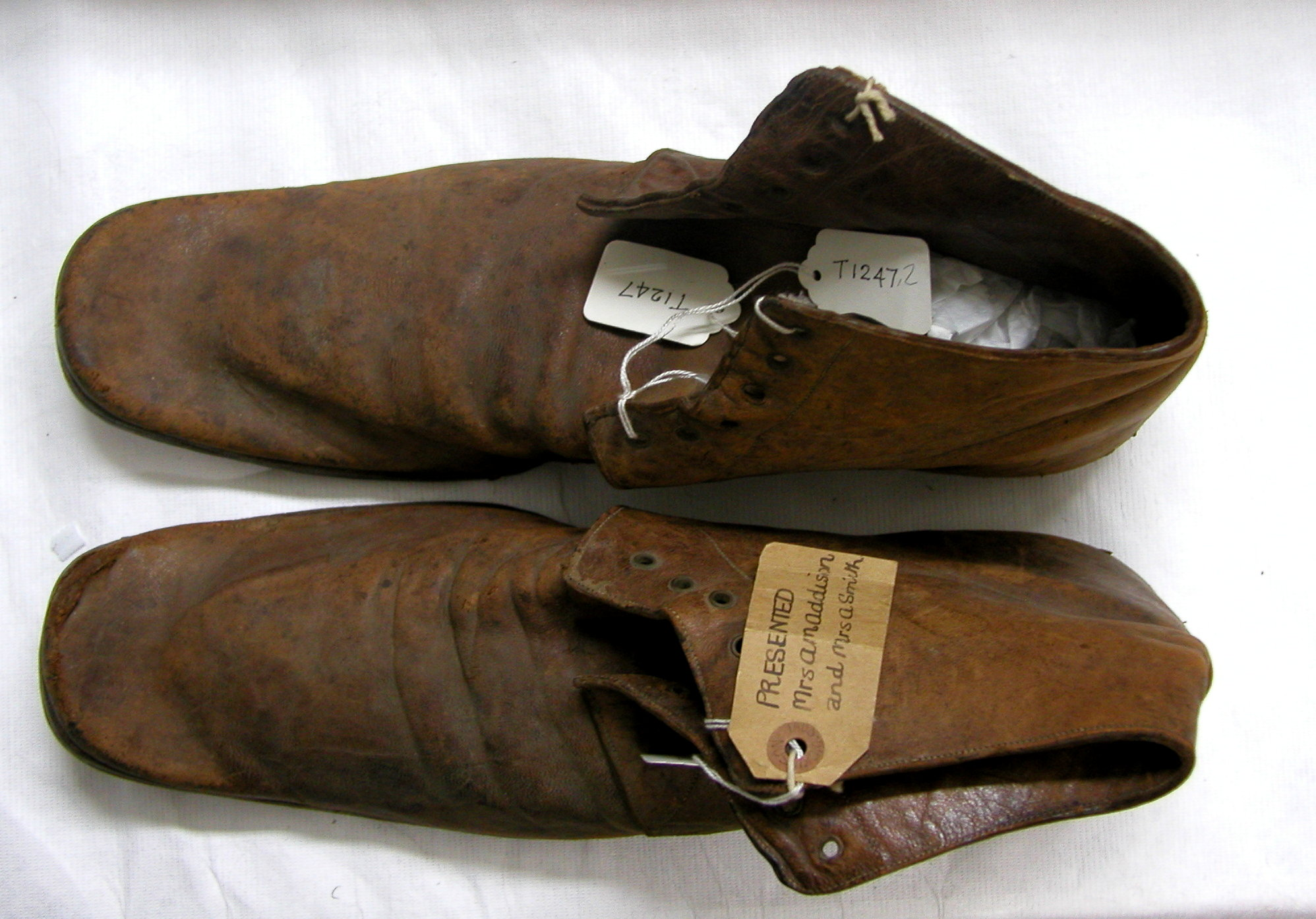
A pair of boots with symmetrically pointed unstructured square toe boxes.

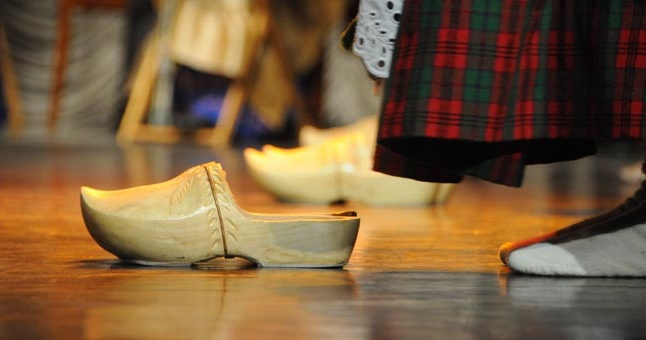
Entirely wooden clogs are rigid. While they are fairly foot-shaped inside, they often have bulky, pointed "duck-tail" external toe boxes, with substantial external toe spring.

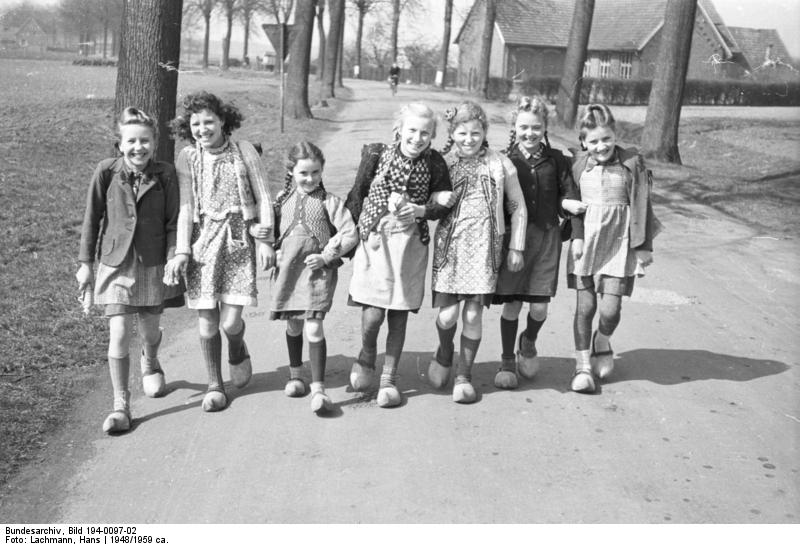
The internal and external shape of a wooden clog allows the shoes to rock forwards, so the foot can push off in a fairly normal gait.

== Horizontal profile ==
Toe boxes also come in various widths and horizontal-plane shapes. Foot-shaped toe boxes are rare. Most toe boxes are widest at the ball of the foot, then taper towards the toes, although the foot widens from the base of the toes forwards. Toe boxes often taper symmetrically, from both sides; feet do not. If toe box taper is wide enough that it is outside the space needed by the foot, a tapered toe box can be comfortable. Many shoes have a toe box which is excessively narrow in relation to heel width; if a sufficiently wide toe box can be picked out, the shoe will often be loose on the heel. Some shoe manufacturers make "split sizes", where the toe and heel size are varied independently, on a combination last.

There are periodic fashions for pointy-toes shoes. Pointy-toed poulaines were fashionable in the 14th and 15th centuries. Skeletons of people who lived in this time are much more likely to have bunions, and richer people, who were more likely to wear pointy-toed shoes, were more likely to have bunions. Winkle pickers, fashionable in the mid 20th century, were also quite pointed.

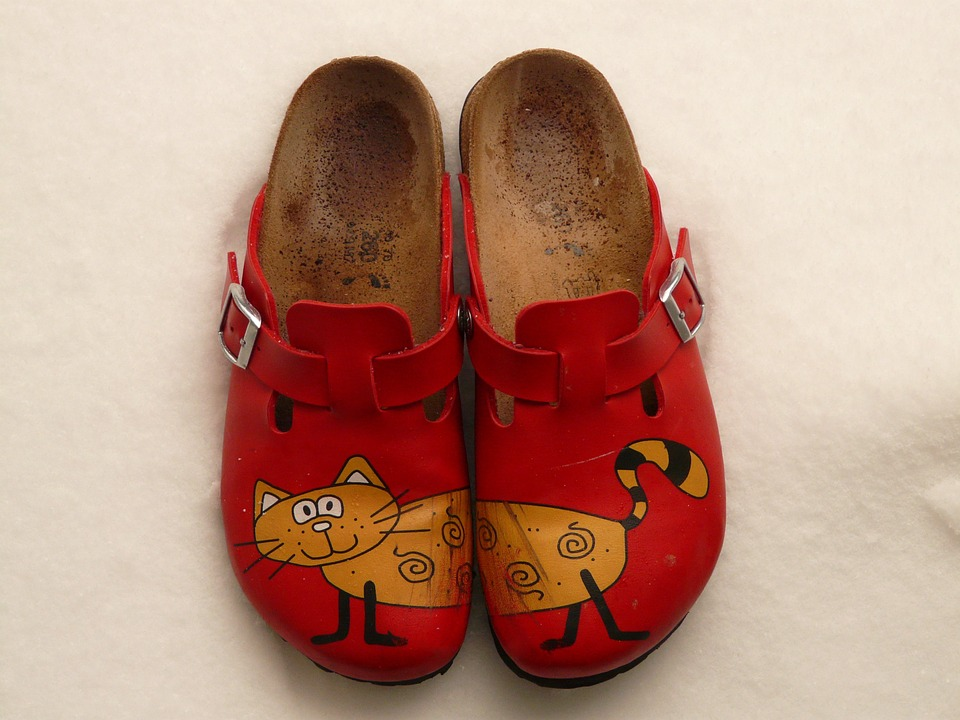
A rounded, asymmetical toe box, probably fairly deep. These are quite toe-shaped toeboxes. The toe box does not narrow on the inside, allowing the big toe to point straight forward

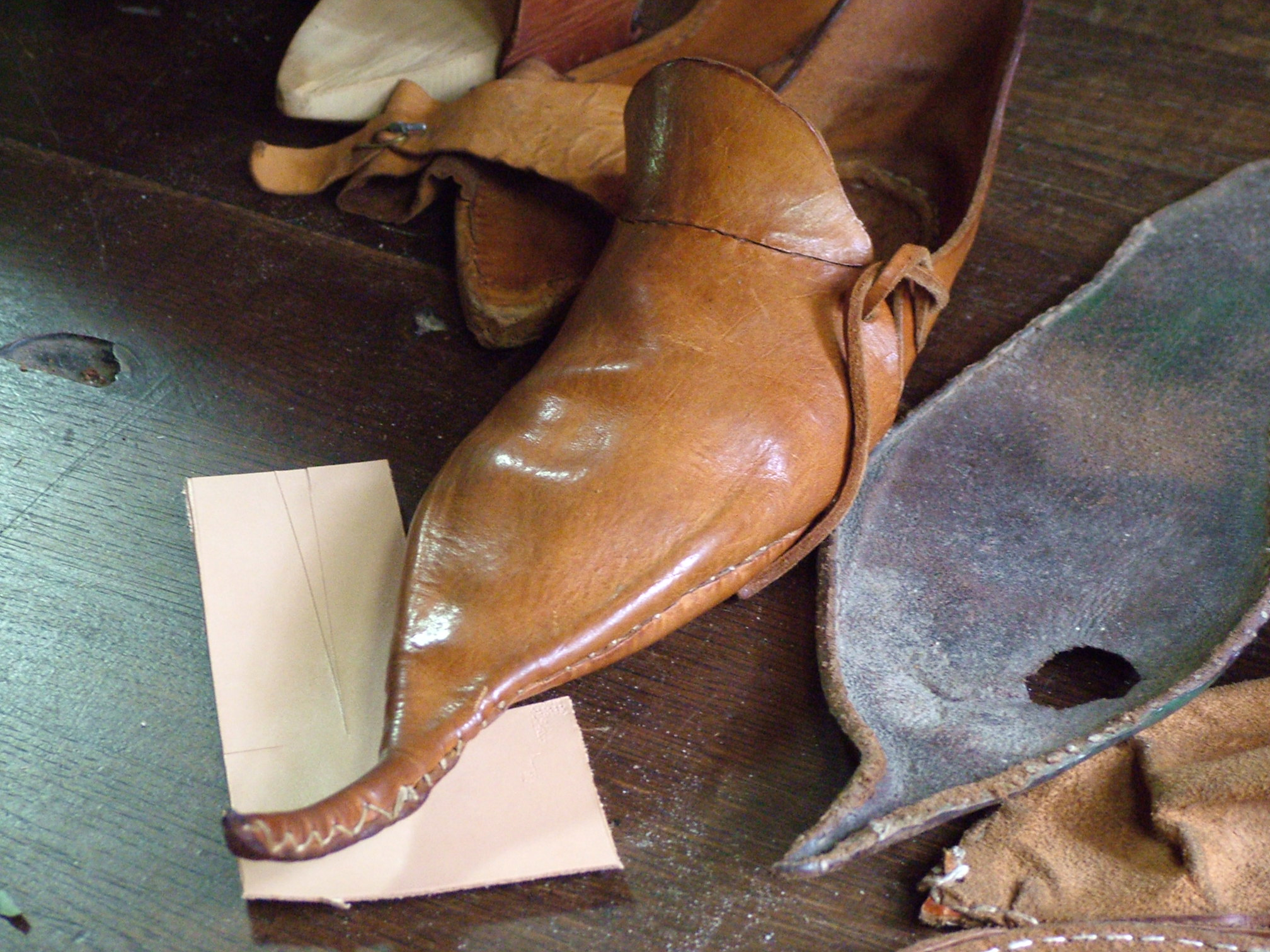
Poulaines are turnshoes which have toe boxes with protruding points.

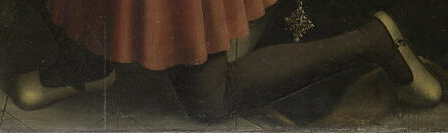
Duckbill shoes came into fashion as poulaines went out of fashion.

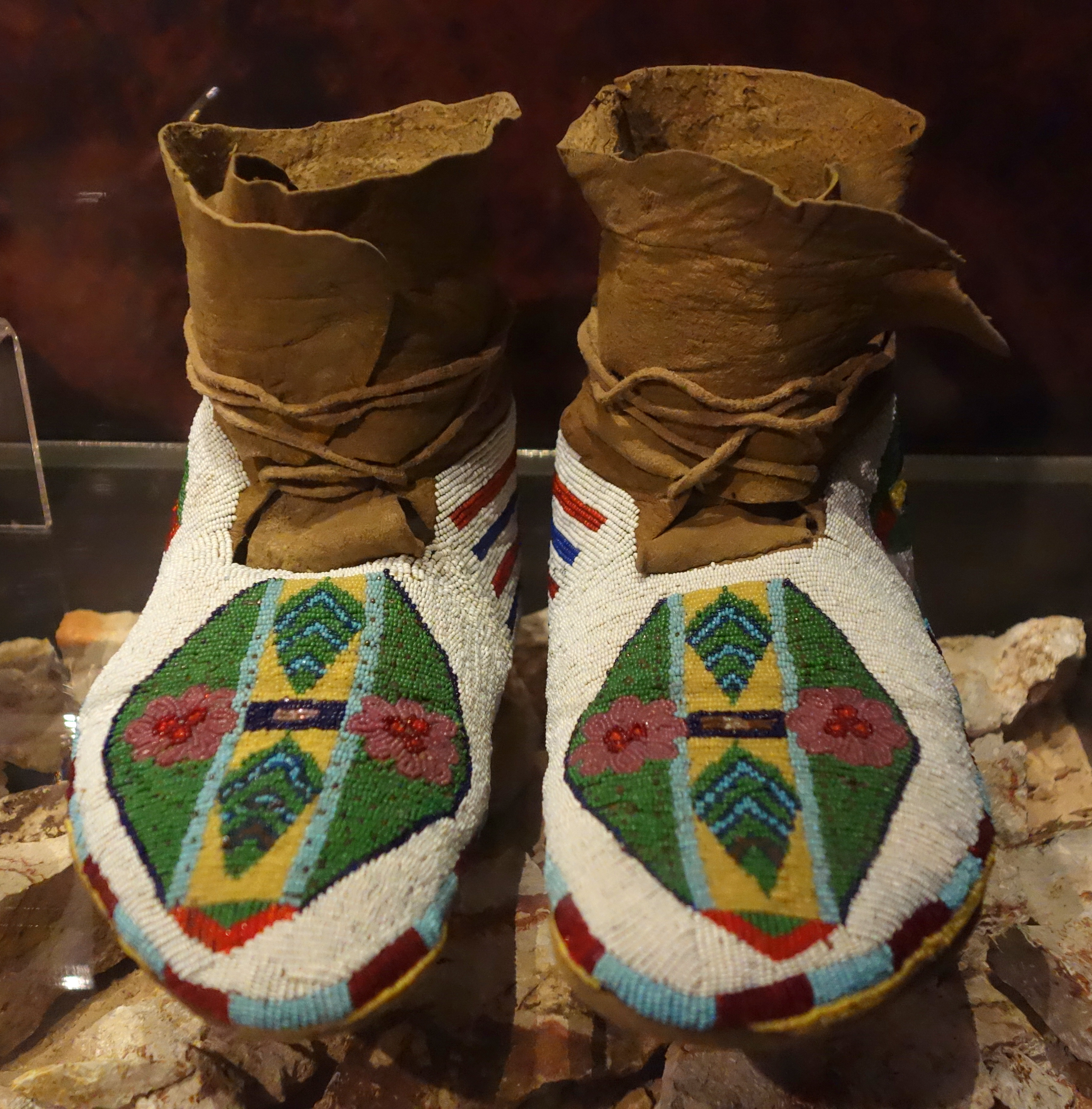
Moccasins are turnshoes. These ones have wide, asymmetrical, rounded toe boxes

== Split toe boxes ==
Some toe boxes are split. Some are split into two pockets, like those of jika-tabi; others are split into more pockets. Five-pocket toe boxes, with one pocket per toe, can be difficult to fit, as each pocket may be too long, too short, too wide, or too narrow. Splitting the toe box helps allow toe splay and gripping.

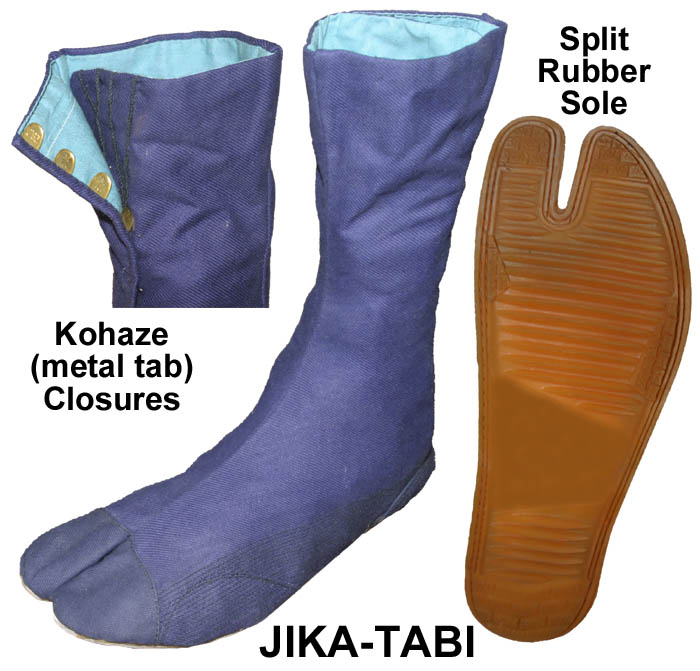
Jika-tabi with a split two-pocket tabi toe box

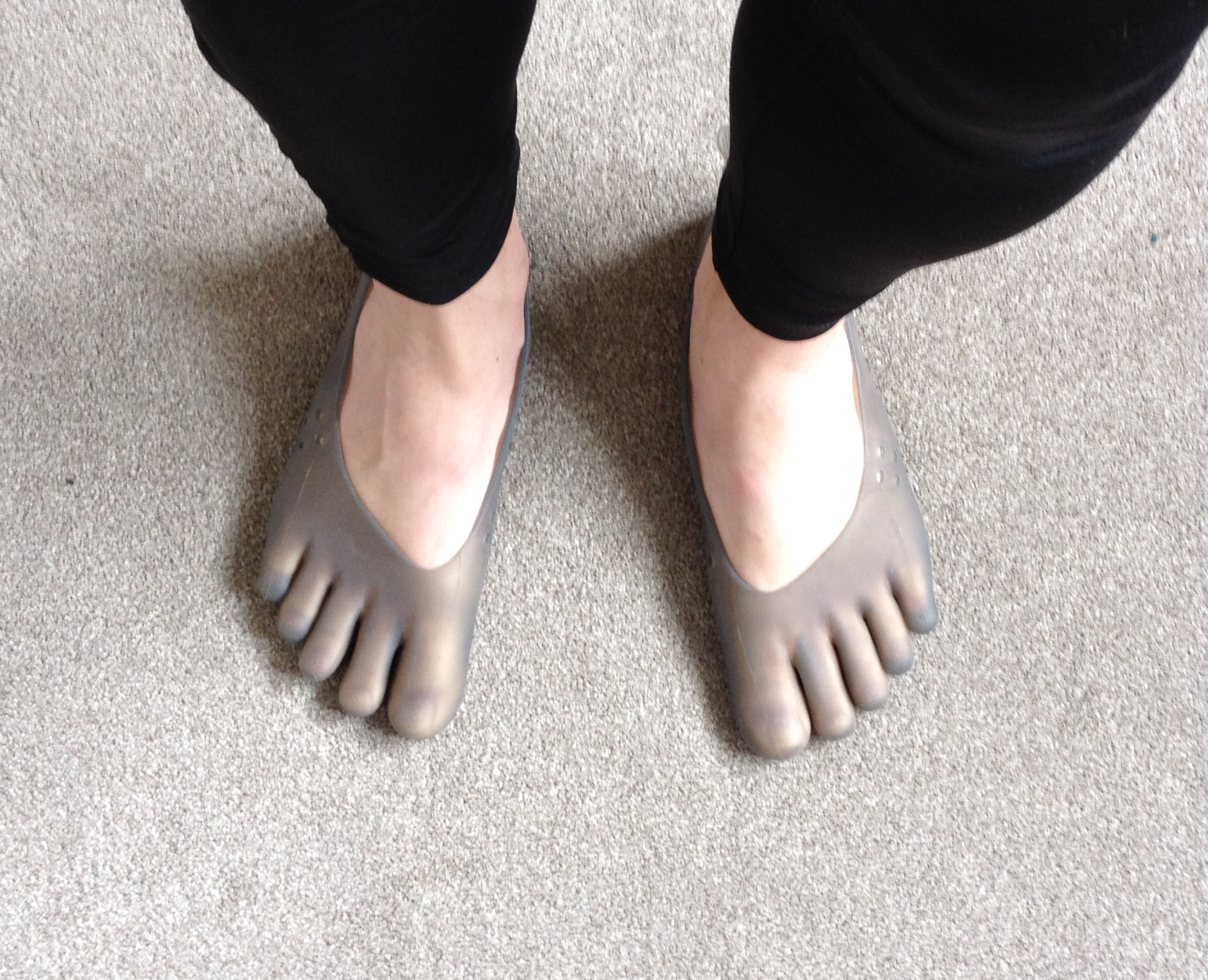
Five-toed shoes, transparent. It can be seen that the wearer's big toes are a bit too long for their pockets, and the small toes too short.

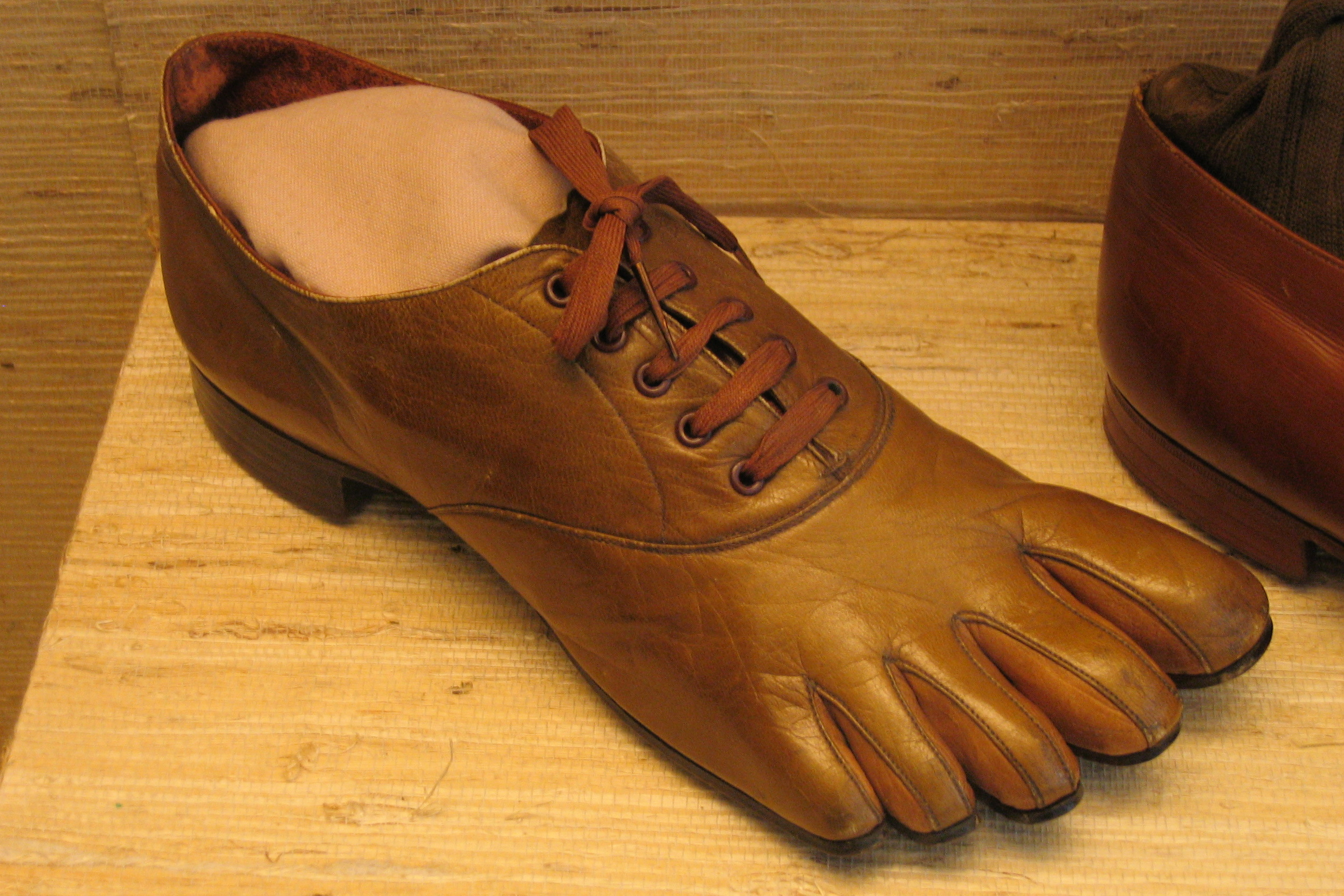
A more conventional shoe with a five-pocket toe box

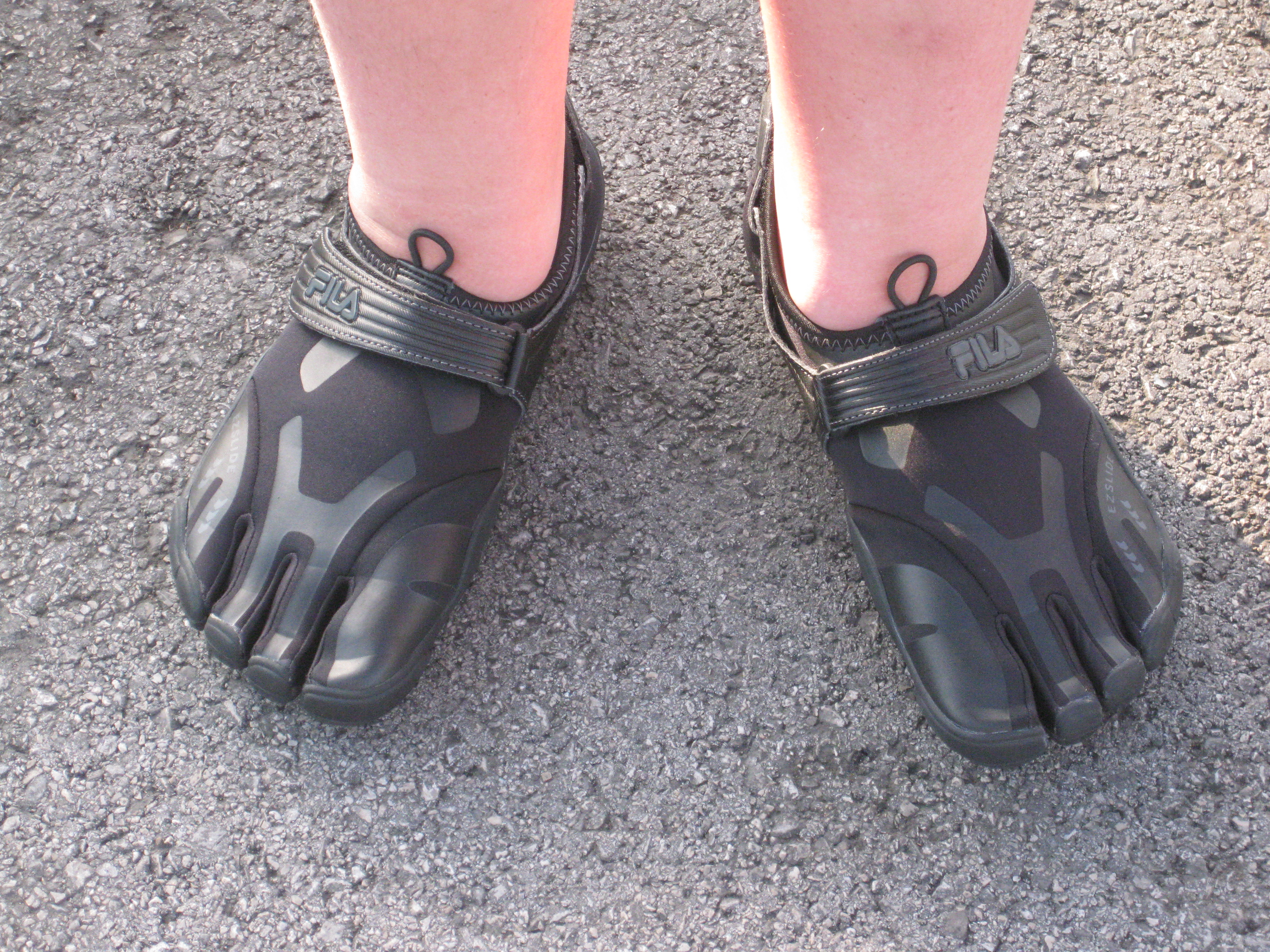
Four-pocket toe box

== Applications ==
=== Military ===
An early 20th century survey by the United States Army Medical Corps's Army Shoe Board found that less than five percent of the enlisted men had good feet, and attributed most of the problems to poor shoe fit (including civilian shoes). The toe boxes of the new military-issue shoes were therefore designed to fit mildly deformed rather than undeformed feet. The Shoe Board recognized that fit would be imperfect, and recommended breaking in new shoes rapidly by standing in them in 3 inches (76 mm) of water for up to 5 minutes, to soak the leather through, and then walking on a level surface outdoors for up to 1 hour, or until the shoes have dried. Failing this, they suggested breaking them in by wearing them for initially short periods, progressively lengthened, to break in the shoe rather than the foot. They also recommended using special shoe stretchers with removable pegs to stretch the toe boxes wider, and stretch bumps over blisters, corns, and bunions.

=== Ballet ===
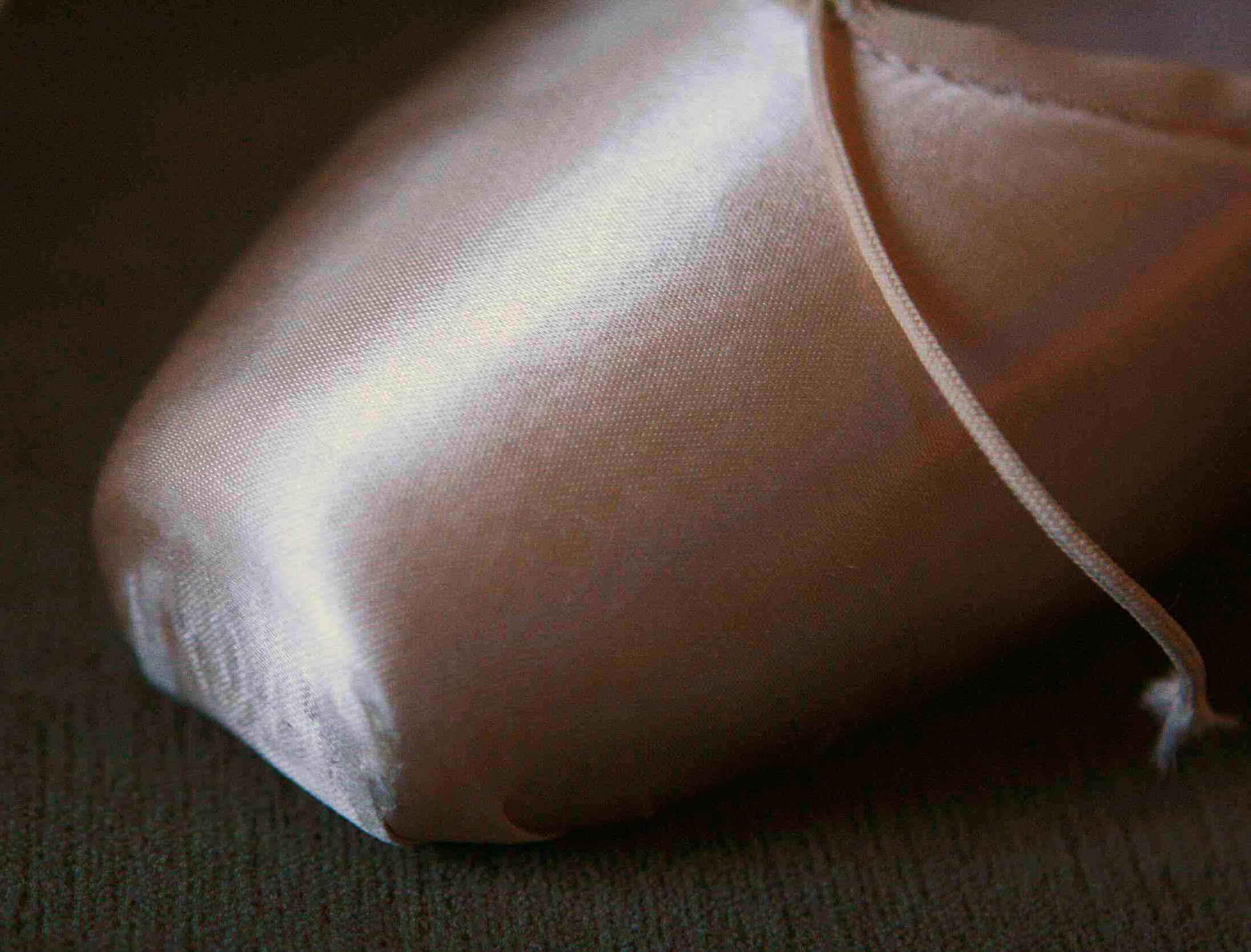
Toe box of a ballet shoe, a rigid shell tightly covered in satin. The flat platform at the end of the toe box bears the dancer's whole weight when en pointe.

Ballet pointe shoes have highly specialized toe boxes, as the end of the toe boxes, called the platform, must bear a dancer's entire weight when dancing en pointe. This is a pressure of about 220 psi or 1.5 MPa. When a dancer leaps and lands en pointe, the higher transient load, acting on the same area, briefly creates a much higher pressure. The toe box is a rigid socket, built from layers of paper, glue, and fabric (usually burlap), and covered with a satin fabric. They sometimes contain plastic, but this tends to produce a stiff shoe and is not popular. The toe boxes start out too stiff to dance in, and must be broken in; after a certain amount of dancing, depending on technique and conditions, the toe boxes become too soft to support the foot. Reinforcement with fresh glue may postpone the date when the shoes must be replaced.

The toe box of a pointe shoe must be carefully fitted, with width of the toe box according with the dancer's toe shape. When the dancer stands with the feet pointing straight ahead and parallel (sixth position), and bends their knees deeply without raising their heels from the floor (a demi-plié), the feet lengthen; the toes should just touch the platform when in this position. The top of the toe box should be long enough that the throat (edge) falls a bit beyond the far end of the third phalanx, covering it entirely. Dancers often wear specialized padding around and between their toes.

== Creasing ==
A stiff, multipiece shoe with toe caps, which has been left on the last a long time, will crease less across the toe box. Leather quality has little effect. Using a shoe tree and a shoehorn will reduce creasing. Creasing is a cosmetic concern, but generally does not impair function.

== See also ==
- Steel-toe boot
