= Antichrist (film) =

2009 film by Lars von Trier

- Theatrical release poster
- Directed by: Lars von Trier
- Written by: Lars von Trier
- Produced by: Meta Louise Foldager
- Starring: Willem Dafoe; Charlotte Gainsbourg
- Cinematography: Anthony Dod Mantle
- Edited by: Anders Refn; Åsa Mossberg
- Music by: Kristian Eidnes Andersen
- Production companies: Zentropa Entertainments; Arte France Cinéma; Canal+; Danmarks Radio; Film i Väst; Svenska Filminstitutet; Sveriges Television; ZDF
- Distributed by: Nordisk Film Distribution (Denmark/Sweden); Les Films du Losange (France); MFA+ Film Distribution (Germany); Gutek Film (Poland)
- Release dates: 18 May 2009 (Cannes); 20 May 2009 (Denmark); 10 September 2009 (Germany)
- Running time: 108 minutes
- Countries: Denmark; France; Germany; Poland; Sweden
- Language: English
- Budget: $5 million
- Box office: $7.4 million

Antichrist (stylized as ANTICHRIS♀) is a 2009 art horror film written and directed by Lars von Trier. It stars Willem Dafoe and Charlotte Gainsbourg as a married couple who experience the accidental death of their infant son, after which they retreat to a cabin in the woods to grieve, where the man experiences strange visions and the woman manifests increasingly violent sexual behavior and sadomasochism. The narrative is divided into a prologue, four chapters, and an epilogue.

Written in 2006 while Trier was hospitalized due to a significant episode of clinical depression, the film was largely influenced by his own struggles with depression and anxiety. Filming took place primarily in Germany during the late summer of 2008, and was a Danish production co-produced by companies from France, Germany, Poland, and Sweden.

After its premiere at the 2009 Cannes Film Festival, where Gainsbourg won Best Actress, Antichrist immediately received polarizing feedback; critics generally praised its artistic execution, but remained strongly divided regarding its substantive merit. Other awards won by the film include the Bodil Award for Best Danish Film, Robert Award for Best Danish Film, Nordic Council Film Prize for Best Nordic Film, and the European Film Award for Best Cinematography. The film is dedicated to Soviet filmmaker Andrei Tarkovsky.

Antichrist is the first film in Trier's unofficially titled Depression Trilogy. It was followed in 2011 by Melancholia and then by Nymphomaniac in 2014.

== Plot ==
An unnamed couple have sex in their Seattle apartment while their unsupervised infant son, Nic, climbs up to the bedroom window and falls out of it to his death. The mother collapses at the funeral and spends the next month in the hospital crippled with atypical grief. The father, a therapist, is skeptical of the psychiatric care she is receiving and takes it upon himself to treat her personally with psychotherapy. She reveals that her second greatest fear is nature, prompting him to try exposure therapy. They hike to their isolated cabin in the woods, called Eden, where she spent time with Nic the previous summer while writing a thesis criticizing gynocide. During the hike, he encounters a deer that shows no fear of him and has a stillborn fawn hanging halfway out of her.

During sessions of psychotherapy, the woman becomes increasingly grief-stricken and manic, often demanding forceful sex. The area becomes increasingly sinister to the man; acorns rapidly pelt the metal roof, he wakes up with a hand covered in ticks that have fed on his blood, and he encounters a self-disemboweling red fox that tells him "chaos reigns." In the dark attic, the man finds the woman's thesis studies, which include violent portraits of witch hunts and a scrapbook in which her writing becomes increasingly frantic and illegible. She reveals that, while writing, she came to believe that all women are inherently evil. The man reprimands her for this and, in a frenzied moment, they have violent sex at the base of an ominous dead tree where bodies are intertwined within the exposed roots. He suspects that Satan is her greatest hidden fear.

Upon viewing Nic's autopsy and photos the woman took of him while they stayed at Eden, the man becomes aware that she had been systematically putting Nic's shoes on the wrong feet, resulting in a foot deformity. She attacks him in the shed, accuses him of planning to leave her, initiates sex with him, and then smashes a large block of wood onto his erect penis, causing him to lose consciousness. She then masturbates him until he ejaculates blood. She drills a hole through his leg, bolting a heavy grindstone through the wound, and tosses the wrench she used under the cabin. The man awakens alone; unable to loosen the bolt, he hides by dragging himself into a deep foxhole at the base of the dead tree. Following the sound of a crow he found buried alive in the hole, the woman locates and attacks him before partially burying him.

Night falls. Now remorseful, the woman digs up the man but cannot remember where the wrench is. She helps him back to the cabin, where she tells him that only "when the Three Beggars arrive" can he die. The woman recounts that she saw Nic climbing up to the window on the night of his death and intentionally allowed him to fall from it, displaying her perceived evil. In the cabin, she cuts off her clitoris. The two are then visited by the crow (symbol of despair), the deer (symbol of grief), and the fox (symbol of pain), referred to as the Three Beggars. A hailstorm begins; it was earlier revealed that women accused of witchcraft had been known to have the power to summon hailstorms. When he finds the wrench under the cabin's floorboards, she attacks him with scissors, but he manages to unbolt the grindstone. Finally free, he strangles her to death then builds a pyre, lighting it to cremate her body.

The man limps from the cabin and eats wild berries, as the Three Beggars look on, now translucent and glowing. Under a brilliant light, the man reaches the top of a hill and watches in awe as a procession of hundreds of women – wearing antiquated clothing and with their faces blurred – approach him before walking past, continuing to walk deeper into the forest.

== Cast ==
- Willem Dafoe as an unnamed married man, credited as "He." Dafoe also voiced the fox that says "Chaos reigns."
- Charlotte Gainsbourg as an unnamed woman married to the man, credited as "She"
- Storm Acheche Sahlstrøm as Nic, the couple's toddler son who dies in the beginning of the film

== Analysis ==
=== Nature and religion ===
Film scholar Magdalena Zolkos interprets Antichrist as an "origins story", citing its unnamed characters and setting—a woods called Eden—as primary reasons. Zolkos's interpretation of the film aligns with that of scholar Joanne Bourke, who cites the film as a retelling of Abrahamic origins "framed as a question." The couple's entrance into the woods and arrival at Eden "initiates a cinematic restaging of the myths of origins." The woman's statement made to her husband—that nature is "Satan's church"—suggests a "triadic nexus of nature, demonic force and the death of the child." Zolkos characterizes this nexus as being made of three "separate, psychic events: the inscrutable and threatening surroundings of the forest; her readings in the history of religious misogyny; and an accident when she loses the child in the woods a year before his death."

Zolkos also notes the film as a "story of parental loss and the mourning and despair that follows."

=== Depression and mental illness ===
While the film interweaves multiple themes in Zolkos's reading, she suggests that the film is fundamentally a "very personal and revealing film—interwoven with idioms and images that document Trier's struggle with serious psychiatric disorder, and highly informed by his experience of cognitive behaviour and exposure therapy, shamanism and Jungian psychoanalysis." Trier commented on the experience of making the film as being a "fun" way of working through his own depression. Trier considers the film the first of his "Depression Trilogy", followed by Melancholia (2011) and Nymphomaniac (2013).

Scholar Amy Simmons notes that the film's aesthetic components "transcend categories, and as such, his work cannot be reduced to any one message." She considers the film a "genuinely radical and unflinching account of human relationships." Robert Sinnerbrink interprets the film (along with Melancholia and Nymphomaniac) as engaging with human responses to psychological trauma. He explains: "In each case, there is a central female protagonist whose melancholic responses to this central trauma open up a space of subjective but also aesthetic-expressive engagement... In Antichrist, it is evident in the woman's intense anxiety and depressive withdrawal expressed through the neo-romantic landscape and supernaturalist elements of the forest to which she and her partner have retreated."

== Production ==
=== Development ===
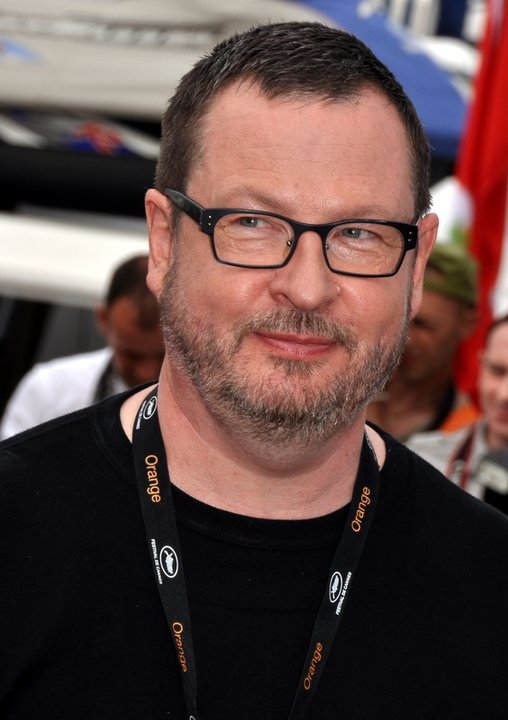
Lars von Trier, the director and screenwriter of Antichrist, in 2011

Trier began writing Antichrist in 2006 while being hospitalized for depression. Trier conceived the film as a horror film, as he felt it allowed for "a lot of very, very strange images." He had recently seen several contemporary Japanese horror films such as Ring and Dark Water, from which he drew inspiration. Another basic idea came from a documentary Trier saw about the original forests of Europe. In the documentary the forests were portrayed as a place of great pain and suffering as the different species tried to kill and eat each other. Trier was fascinated by the contrast between this and the view of nature as a romantic and peaceful place. Trier said: "At the same time that we hang it on our walls over the fireplace or whatever, it represents pure Hell." In retrospect he said that he had become unsure whether Antichrist really could be classified as a horror film, because "it's not so horrific ... we didn't try so hard to do shocks, and that is maybe why it is not a horror film. I took [the horror genre] more as an inspiration, and then this strange story came out of it."

The title was the first thing that was written for the film. Antichrist was originally scheduled for production in 2005, but its executive producer Peter Aalbæk Jensen accidentally revealed the film's planned revelation: that earth was created by Satan and not by God. Trier was furious and decided to delay the shoot so he could rewrite the script.

In 2007, Trier announced that he was suffering from depression, and that it was possible that he never would be able to make another film. "I assume that Antichrist will be my next film. But right now I don't know," he told the Danish newspaper Politiken. During an early casting attempt, English actors who had come to Copenhagen had to be sent home, while Trier was crying because his poor condition did not allow him to meet them.

The post-depression version of the script was to some extent written as an exercise for Trier, to see if he had recovered enough to be able to work again. Trier has also made references to August Strindberg and his Inferno Crisis in the 1890s, comparing it to his own writing under difficult mental circumstances: "was Antichrist my Inferno Crisis?" Several notable names appear in the credits as having assisted Trier in the writing. Danish writer and directors Per Fly and Nikolaj Arcel are listed as script consultants, and Anders Thomas Jensen as story supervisor. Also credited are researchers dedicated to fields including "misogyny", "anxiety", "horror films" and "theology". Trier is a Catholic convert and intensely interested in Christian symbolism and theology.

Production was led by Trier's Copenhagen-based company Zentropa. Co-producers were Sweden's Film i Väst, Italy's Lucky Red and France's Liberator Productions, Slot Machine and Arte France. The Danish Film Institute contributed with a financial support of $1.5 million and Filmstiftung Nordrhein-Westfalen in Germany with $1.3 million. The total budget was around $5 million.

=== Pre-production ===
Props for the more violent scenes were provided by the company Soda ApS, and made in their workshop in Nørrebro, Copenhagen. Plaster casts were made of Willem Dafoe's leg and the female "porno double's" vulva. A plastic baby with authentic weight was made for the opening sequence. Pictures found using Google Image Search had to serve as models for the stillborn deer, and a nylon stocking was used as caul. The vulva prop was constructed with its inner parts detachable for easy preparation if several takes would be needed. Czech animal trainer Ota Bares, who had collaborated with parts of the crew in the 2005 film Adam's Apples, was hired early on and given instructions about what tasks the animals must be able to perform. The fox, for example, was taught to open its mouth on a given command to simulate speaking movements.

To get into the right mood before filming started, both Willem Dafoe and Charlotte Gainsbourg were shown Andrei Tarkovsky's Mirror from 1975. Dafoe was also shown Trier's own 1998 film The Idiots, and Gainsbourg The Night Porter to study Charlotte Rampling's character. Dafoe also met therapists working with cognitive behavioral therapy as well as being present at actual sessions of exposure therapy and studying material on the topic.

=== Casting ===
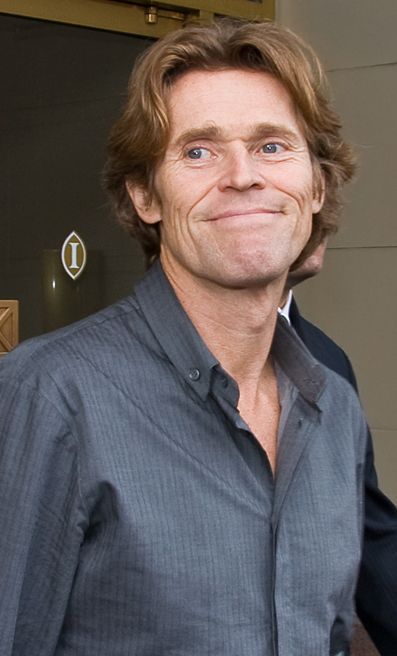
Dafoe at the Toronto International Film Festival, 2009

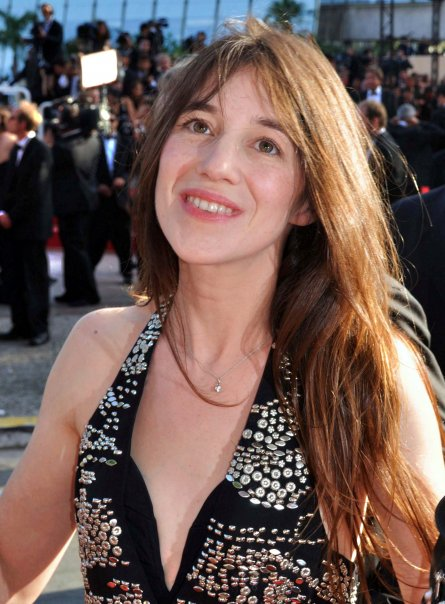
Gainsbourg at the Cannes Film Festival, 2009

Dafoe, who had previously worked with Lars von Trier in Manderlay (2005), was cast as "He" after contacting Trier and asking what he was working on at the moment. He received the script for Antichrist, although he was told that Trier's wife was skeptical about asking a renowned actor like Dafoe to do such an extreme role. Dafoe accepted the part, later explaining its appeal to him: "I think the dark stuff, the unspoken stuff is more potent for an actor. It's the stuff we don't talk about, so if you have the opportunity to apply yourself to that stuff in a playful, creative way, yes I'm attracted to it." The voice of the talking fox was also supplied by Dafoe, although the recording was heavily manipulated.

In casting the role of "She", actress Eva Green had been initially approached for the female lead. According to Trier, Green was determined to appear in the film, but her agents refused to allow her. The unsuccessful casting attempt took two months of the pre-production process. Eventually, Gainsbourg expressed interest in the role, and by Trier's words she was very eager to get cast: "Charlotte came in and said, 'I'm dying to get the part no matter what.' So I think it was a decision she made very early and she stuck to it. We had no problems whatsoever." Gainsbourg recalled upon first meeting Trier that she had "known his films", but knew "very little about the man himself", and noted his presence as being "filled with anxiety" upon their first meeting. She also initially expressed worry over the film's more emotional sequences, particularly surrounding her character's panic attacks and anxiety, as they were not things she had experienced in her own life.

=== Filming ===
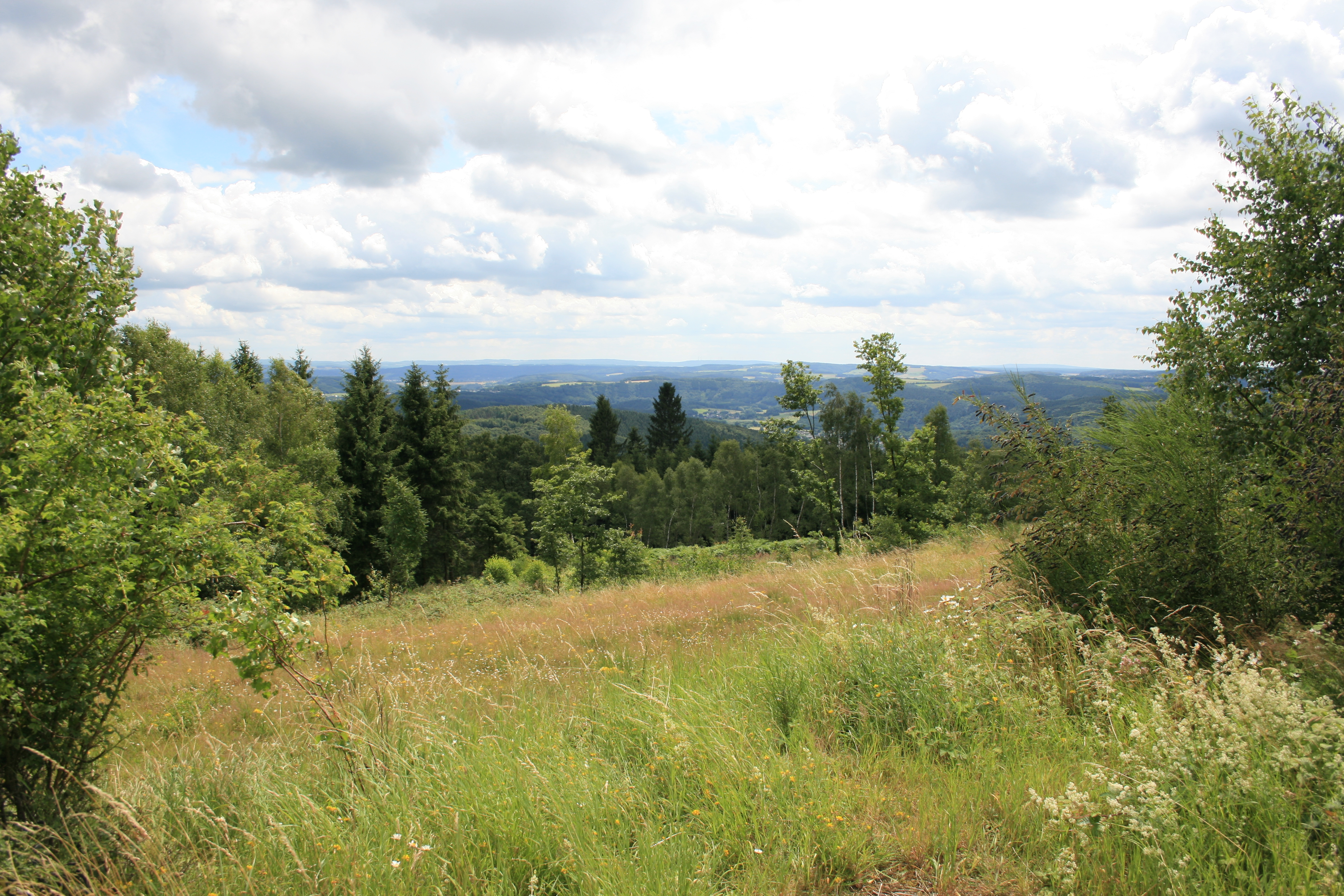
The forests of Rhein-Sieg-Kreis in Germany stood in for mountainous regions in Washington state, U.S., where the film is set.

Filming took 40 days to finish, from 20 August to the end of September 2008. The film was shot in the German state of North Rhine-Westphalia. Locations were used in Rhein-Sieg-Kreis, part of the Cologne region (including rural areas in Nutscheid) and Wuppertal. It was the first film by Trier to be entirely filmed in Germany. The fictional setting of the film, however is, near Seattle, USA. The film was shot on digital video, primarily using Red One cameras in 4K resolution. The slow-motion sequences were shot with a Phantom V4 in 1,000 frames per second. Filming techniques involved dollys, hand-held camerawork and computer-programmed "motion control", of which the team had previous experience from Trier's 2006 film The Boss of It All. One shot, where the couple is having sex under a tree, was particularly difficult since the camera would switch from being hand-held to motion controlled in the middle of the take.

Trier had not recovered completely from his depression when filming started. He repeatedly excused himself to the actors for being in the mental condition he was, and was not able to operate the camera as he usually does, which made him very frustrated. "The script was filmed and finished without much enthusiasm, made as it was using about half of my physical and intellectual capacity", the director said in an interview. Gainsbourg recalled that Trier provided little direction during the shoot, but characterized the filming process as freeing and allowing room for both herself and Dafoe to experiment with varying performance styles.

=== Post-production ===
Except for the eyes and ears, the fox's face was computer-generated.

Post-production was primarily located in Warsaw, Poland, and Gothenburg, Sweden. Over the time of two months, the Poles contributed with about 4,000 hours of work and the Swedes 500. The film features 80 shots with computer-generated imagery, provided by the Polish company Platige Image. Most of these shots consist of digitally removed details such as the collar and leash used to lead the deer, but some were more complicated. The scene where the fox utters the words "chaos reigns" was particularly difficult to make. The mouth movements had to be entirely computer-generated in order to synchronize with the sound. The sex scene in Chapter Three during which numerous hands emerge from the roots of a tree was subsequently adapted into the principal promotional art for the film.

=== Music ===
The aria "Lascia ch'io pianga" from Handel's opera Rinaldo is used as the film's main musical theme. The aria has previously been used in other films such as Farinelli, a 1994 biographical film about the castrato singer Farinelli, and was used again by Trier in Nymphomaniac during a scene referencing the sequence showing Nic approaching the open window. Recorded in January 2009 at the Kastelskirken (Citadel Church) in Copenhagen, the film's versions of "Lascia ch'io pianga" were performed by Bjarte Eike (violin), Tuva Semmingsen (mezzo-soprano), Karina Gauvin (soprano) and Tempo Rubato ensemble.

Kristian Eidnes Andersen composed the unconventional ambient "score". Until 2019, it was Eidnes Andersen's only credit for a film's composition—aside from television or documentary work—though he had previously collaborated with Trier as a sound designer on several films. The musician and critic Robert Barry described the score as the film's "in-between bits, the judders and rumbles and low howls drifting somewhere undecidable between composed music and sound design ... the un-music, the audiable, the hum of the world."

==== Soundtrack album ====
Antichrist

Soundtrack album by Kristian Eidnes Andersen
- Released: 6 September 2019
- Recorded: January 2009
- Venues: Kastelskirken, Copenhagen
- Length: 17:25
- Label: Cold Spring

A decade after the film's theatrical run, its soundtrack saw a limited-edition vinyl release, issued on 6 September 2019 by the English record label Cold Spring. The soundtrack album features both versions of "Lascia ch'io pianga" and selected extracts from Eidnes Andersen's score. Its runtime is relatively brief: only the first side of the vinyl LP has audio, while the other blank side is etched with the words "nature is satan's church" in a "Gothic" typeface.

No.	Title	Music	Length
1.	"Intro"	Kristian Eidnes Andersen	1:32
2.	"Lascia Ch'io Pianga Prologue"	George Frideric Handel	5:22
3.	"Train"	Eidnes Anderson	0:35
4.	"Foetus"	Eidnes Anderson	1:13
5.	"Attic"	Eidnes Anderson	1:32
6.	"Lascia Ch'io Pianga Epilogue"	Handel	2:33
7.	"Credits Pt. 1"	Eidnes Anderson	1:17
8.	"Credits Pt. 2"	Eidnes Anderson	3:21
Total length:			17:25

== Release ==
The film premiered during the Competition portion of the 2009 Cannes Film Festival to a polarized audience response. The film prompted several walkouts and at least four people fainted during the preview due to the explicit violence. At the subsequent press conference, Trier was asked by a journalist from the Daily Mail to justify why he made the film, to which the director responded that he found the question strange since he considered the audience as his guests, "not the other way around." He then claimed to be the best director in the world. Gainsbourg won the festival's award for Best Actress. The ecumenical jury at the Cannes festival gave the film a special "anti-award" and declared the film to be "the most misogynist movie from the self-proclaimed biggest director in the world." Cannes festival director Thierry Frémaux responded that this was a "ridiculous decision that borders on a call for censorship" and that it was "scandalous coming from an 'ecumenical' jury". The "talking fox" was nominated for the Palm Dog, but lost to Dug from Up.

=== Ratings and censorship ===
Two versions were available for buyers at the Cannes film market, nicknamed the "Catholic" and "Protestant" versions, where the former had some of the most explicit scenes removed while the latter was uncut. The uncut version was released theatrically to a general audience on 20 May 2009 in Denmark. It was acquired for British distribution by Artificial Eye and American by IFC Films. In the United Kingdom, it had a limited release beginning on 24 July 2009, and in the United States on 23 October 2009. The film was not submitted to the Motion Picture Association of America (MPAA), and released unrated in the United States, as the filmmakers knew the graphic violence and sex would get an NC-17 rating. When it aired on TV it was given a TV-MA rating, which is the highest rating for TV Parental Guidelines. In both Ireland and the United Kingdom, Antichrist was also released uncut, bearing an 18 certificate. David Cooke of the British Board of Film Classification (BBFC) commented on the decision to leave the film uncut, saying:

The film does not contain material which breaches the law or poses a significant harm risk to adults. The sexual imagery, while strong, is relatively brief, and the Board has passed a number works containing such images. This reflects the principle that adults should be free to decide for themselves what to watch or what not to watch, provided it is neither illegal nor harmful. There is no doubt that some viewers will find the images disturbing and offensive, but the BBFC's consumer advice provides a clear warning to enable individuals to make an informed viewing choice.

The British Advertising Standards Authority received seven complaints about the poster, which was based on the original poster and shows the couple as they are having sexual intercourse. The organization decided to approve the poster, finding it to not be pornographic since its "dark tone" made it "unlikely to cause sexual excitement". An alternative poster, featuring only quotes from reviews and no image at all, was used in outdoor venues and as an alternative for publishers who desired it.

On 3 June 2009 the film was released in France with a 16 rating. In 2016, the film was banned in France after the Catholic traditionalist group, Promouvoir, took it (alongside various other films) to court. The ruling French court deemed that the CNC had made "a mistake" in their original decision to pass the film outright and, as a result of this verdict, the original CNC decision was withdrawn, and the film was subsequently banned from cinemas, TV and video within France. This remained until July 2023, when the film was again passed in France, although this time, in a rare move, at the highest classification available (for use) within the country, 18. It is one of only 21 titles since 1975 to have received this most restrictive classification.

=== Critical response ===
In Denmark, the film quickly became successful with both critics and audiences. Politiken called it "a grotesque masterpiece", giving it a perfect score of 6 out of 6, and praised it for being completely unconventional while at the same time being "a profoundly serious, very personal ... piece of art about small things like sorrow, death, sex and the meaninglessness of everything." Berlingske Tidende gave it a rating of 4 out of 6 and praised the "peerless imagery", and how "cinematographer Anthony Dod Mantle effectively switches between Dogme-like hand-held scenes and wonderful stylized tableaux." An exception was Claus Christensen, editor of the Danish film magazine Ekko. Christensen accused the other Danish critics of overrating the film, himself calling it "a master director's failed work". Around 83,000 tickets were sold in Denmark during theatrical run, the best performance by a Trier film since Dogville. The film was nominated by Denmark for The Nordic Council Film Prize, which it won. Antichrist went on to sweep the Robert Awards, Denmark's main national film awards, by winning in seven categories: Best Film, Best Director, Best Screenplay, Best Cinematographer, Best Editing, Best Lighting Design and Best Special Effects.

However, Antichrist polarized critical opinion in the United States. On review aggregation website Rotten Tomatoes, the film has an approval rating of 54% based on 179 reviews, and an average rating of 5.60/10. The website's critical consensus reads, "Gruesome, explicit and highly controversial; Lars von Trier's arthouse-horror, though beautifully shot, is no easy ride." On Metacritic, the film has an average weighted score of 49 out of 100, based on 34 critics, indicating "mixed or average reviews". Roger Ebert of the Chicago Sun-Times gave the film three-and-a-half stars out of four, saying:

Von Trier, who has always been a provocateur, is driven to confront and shake his audience more than any other serious filmmaker. He will do this with sex, pain, boredom, theology and bizarre stylistic experiments. And why not? We are at least convinced we're watching a film precisely as he intended it, and not after a watering down by a fearful studio executive. That said, I know what's in it for von Trier. What was in it for me? More than anything else, I responded to the performances. Feature films may be fiction, but they are certainly documentaries showing actors in front of a camera.

In a blog post, he expanded on this, discussing the film's symbolism, imagery and Trier's intentions, calling him "one of the most heroic directors in the world" and Antichrist "a powerfully-made film that contains material many audiences will find repulsive or unbearable. The performances by Willem Dafoe and Charlotte Gainsbourg are heroic and fearless. Trier's visual command is striking. The use of music is evocative; no score, but operatic and liturgical arias. And if you can think beyond what he shows to what he implies, its depth are [sic] frightening."

Betsy Sharkey of the Los Angeles Times wrote: "The story of Antichrist is a tangled mess of sex, evil and death, with Von Trier making a stab at allegory and old-fashioned horror, but ultimately failing on both fronts... You might think, given the He, She, Eden, etc., that the film is allegory. It is not. Antichrist never rises to the symbolic; instead, it looks like nothing more than a reflection of one man's unresolved issues with the sexual liberation of women." Duane Dudek of the Milwaukee Journal Sentinel called Antichrist "Trier's most visually lush and technically rigorous film; it captures things at a molecular level and in a slow motion that all but brings the world to a halt ... But paradoxically, this is his most unwatchable film, and many will find its violence and cruelty, including scenes of genital mutilation, repellent. I cannot recommend Antichrist, but in a culture that hemorrhages death and torture nightly on shows like 24 or C.S.I., I can understand it."

Arguments for censorship were common in the British press, with much criticism rooted in the EU funding the film received. Despite some controversy, the film was critically well-received in the British film magazine Empire, where film critic Kim Newman gave the film four stars out of five. He noted that "Trier's self-conscious arrogance is calculated to split audiences into extremist factions, but Antichrist delivers enough beauty, terror and wonder to qualify as the strangest and most original horror movie of the year."

Australia's The Monthly critic Luke Davies viewed it as "a bleak but entrancing film that explores guilt, grief and many things besides ... that will anger as many people as it pleases", describing Trier's "command of the visually surreal" as "truly exceptional". Davies described the film as "very good and very flawed", conceding "it is not easy to understand the meaning or intention of specific images and details of the film" but still concludes that "there's something neurotic and reactionary in the controversy and near-hysteria surrounding the film."

Film director John Waters hailed Antichrist as one of the ten best films of 2009 in Artforum, stating "If Ingmar Bergman had committed suicide, gone to hell, and come back to earth to direct an exploitation/art film for drive-ins, [Antichrist] is the movie he would have made."

The film won the award for Best Cinematographer at the 2009 European Film Awards, shared with Slumdog Millionaire as both films were shot by Anthony Dod Mantle. It was nominated for Best Director and Best Actress but the awards lost to Michael Haneke for The White Ribbon and Kate Winslet for The Reader respectively. In a 2016 international poll by BBC, critics Stephanie Zacharek and Andreas Borcholte ranked Antichrist among the greatest films since 2000.

=== Home media ===
The film was given a DVD release in Australia in early 2010; sale of the DVD was strictly limited in South Australia due to new laws that place restrictions on films with an R18+ classification. A notable feature of the Australian release was the creation of a critically acclaimed poster that made prominent use of a pair of rusty scissors that had the actor's faces fused into the handles. The poster received much international coverage at the end of 2009 and was used as the local DVD cover. The film was released on DVD and Blu-ray in the United States through The Criterion Collection on 9 November 2010.

=== Accolades ===
Organization	Category	Recipients and nominees	Result
Belgian Syndicate of Cinema Critics	Grand Prix	Antichrist	Won
Bodil Awards	Best Danish Film	Lars von Trier	Won
Bodil Awards	Best Actress	Charlotte Gainsbourg	Won
Bodil Awards	Best Actor	Willem Dafoe	Won
Bodil Awards	Best Director of Photography	Anthony Dod Mantle	Won
Bodil Awards	Special Bodil	Kristian Eidnes Andersen	Won
Robert Awards	Best Cinematography	Anthony Dod Mantle	Won
Robert Awards	Best Director	Lars von Trier	Won
Robert Awards	Best Editor	Anders Refn	Won
Robert Awards	Best Film	Lars von Trier	Won
Robert Awards	Best Screenplay	Lars von Trier	Won
Robert Awards	Best Sound	Kristian Eidnes Andersen	Won
Robert Awards	Best Special Effects	Peter Hjorth; Ota Bares	Won
Robert Awards	Best Actor	Willem Dafoe	Nominated
Robert Awards	Best Actress	Charlotte Gainsbourg	Nominated
Robert Awards	Best Costume Design	Frauke Firl	Nominated
Robert Awards	Best Make-Up	Hue Lan Van Duc	Nominated
Robert Awards	Best Production Design	Karl Júlíusson	Nominated
Nordic Council	Nordic Council's Film Prize	Lars von Trier	Won
European Film Awards	Best Cinematographer	Anthony Dod Mantle	Won
European Film Awards	Best Actress	Charlotte Gainsbourg	Nominated
European Film Awards	Best Director	Lars von Trier	Nominated
Sant Jordi Awards	Best Foreign Actress (Mejor Actriz Extranjera)	Charlotte Gainsbourg	Won
Zulu Awards	Best Film	Lars von Trier	Nominated

Festivals

Festival	Category	Recipients and nominees	Result
Cannes Film Festival	Best Actress	Charlotte Gainsbourg	Won
Cannes Film Festival	Palme d'Or	Lars von Trier	Nominated
Neuchâtel International Fantastic Film Festival	Titra Film Award	Lars von Trier	Won

== Canceled video game ==
According to a June 2009 article in the Danish newspaper Politiken, a video game called Eden, based on the film, was in the works. It was to start where the film ended. "It will be a self-therapeutic journey into your own darkest fears, and will break the boundaries of what you can and can't do in video games," said video game director Morten Iversen. Even the first concept he made was intended to be a first-person psychological horror genre, with a style of Silent Hill and several Quantic Dream games. Described as a "tie-in epilogue from the film, in which the player would have possibly reprise the role of Willem Dafoe's character, who goes back to the lodge in the woods (called "Eden") to try to figure out the cause for the violent events seen in the movie." The game was conceived to be played multiple times, to see all the different endings and events, as well as being planned to release Eden in 2010 for PC, Xbox Live Arcade and PSN.

In the meantime, Eden has been officially cancelled along with the studio Zentropa Games will be shutting down in the same year due to economic issues. Iversen said, "Even after receiving 100,000 Euro in aid they just couldn't manage to keep it going. It seems that the games industry in Denmark is coming to a crushing halt as now 4 developers have closed in the last 12 months. "There was just no budget to continue development. Over the years it became increasingly clear that there simply was not enough money."

== Works cited ==
- Haynes, Bruce (2009). The End of Early Music: A Period Performer's History of Music for the Twenty-First Century. Oxford: Oxford University Press. ISBN 978-0-19-518987-2.
- Simmons, Amy (2015). Antichrist. New York: Columbia University Press. ISBN 978-0-9930717-1-3.
- Sinnerbrink, Robert (2016). "Provocation and perversity: Lars von Trier's cinematic anti-philosophy". In Jeong, Seung-hoon; Szaniawski, Jeremi (eds.). The Global Auteur: The Politics of Authorship in 21st Century Cinema. London: Bloomsbury Publishing USA. pp. 95–114. ISBN 978-1-5013-1265-6.
- Zolkos, Magdalena (2016). "Violent affects: Nature and the feminine in Antichrist". In Butler, Rex; Denny, David (eds.). Lars von Trier's Women. London: Bloomsbury. pp. 141–158. ISBN 978-1-5013-2245-7.
