= Greek foot =

Greek foot may refer to

- Ancient Greek foot (Ancient Greek: ποῦς, poûs), the ancient Greek unit of length
- A foot, especially in statuary, having a second toe longer than the hallux, as in Morton's toe
