= Czech dysplasia, metatarsal type =

- This disorder is inherited in an autosomal dominant manner
- Specialty: Medical genetics
- Symptoms: Platyspondyly, foot anomalies, and generalized bone anomalids
- Complications: Balance (brachymetarsia)
- Usual onset: Birth
- Duration: Lifelong
- Causes: Genetic mutation
- Risk factors: Being of Czech ancestry.
- Prevention: none
- Frequency: rare, only 28 cases have been described in medical literature
- Deaths: –

Czech dysplasia metatarsal type is a rare type of Czech dysplasia which is characterized primarily by bone anomalies.

== Signs and symptoms ==
Individuals with this condition start showing symptoms of progressive pseudo-rheumatoid arthritis at a young age, variable congenital vertebral defects, congenital hypoplasia/dysplasia of the third and fourth metatarsal bones.

Weather-dependant joint pain is seen occasionally.

== Causes ==
It is caused by a mutation in the COL2A1 gene.

This mutation is called R275C, and it is located in exon 13 of said gene (COL2A1). It is found in most people with Czech dysplasia, metatarsal type.

These mutations are inherited in an autosomal dominant manner, which means that only one copy of a mutated gene (whether inherited or sporadic) is needed for the effects of said mutation to take an effect.

== Management ==
Treatment is done on the symptoms:

- The shortening of the third and fourth metatarsals can be corrected by going through metatarsal lengthening surgery.
- Platyspondyly does not have known effective treatments.
- Pseudo-rheumatoid arthritis can be treated with medication such as nonsteroidal anti-inflammatory drugs, and severe pain sometimes associated with it can be treated with joint arthroplasty.

== Prevalence ==
According to OMIM, 28 cases have been described in medical literature. These cases came from families in Chile, the Czech Republic, Germany, and Japan.

== Eponym ==
This condition's name (Czech dysplasia) was named after the fact that most families with this condition are from/have ancestry from the Czech Republic.
