= Morton's toe =

Type of brachymetatarsia affecting the big toe

- Other names: Morton's syndrome Greek toe
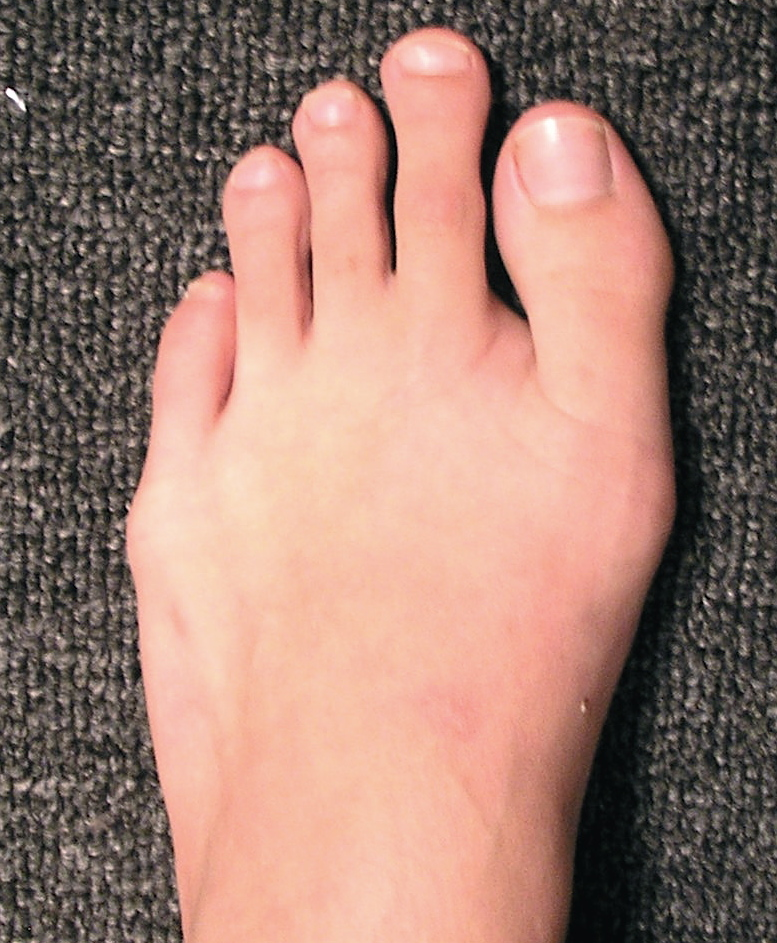
- A Morton's toe so severe the second and third toe are longer than the first toe.
- Dorsal surface of a right foot with Morton's toe (left image) and without (right image). The dashed line highlights joint position. Metatarsals in yellow.
- Specialty: Orthopedics
- Symptoms: A big toe that is short compared to the second toe
- Usual onset: Birth
- Duration: Life-long
- Frequency: 22%

Morton's toe, also known as Greek toe, is the condition of having a first metatarsal bone that is shorter than the second metatarsal (see diagram). It is a type of brachymetatarsia. This condition is the result of a premature closing of the first metatarsal's growth plate, resulting in a short big toe, giving the second toe the appearance of being long compared to the first toe.

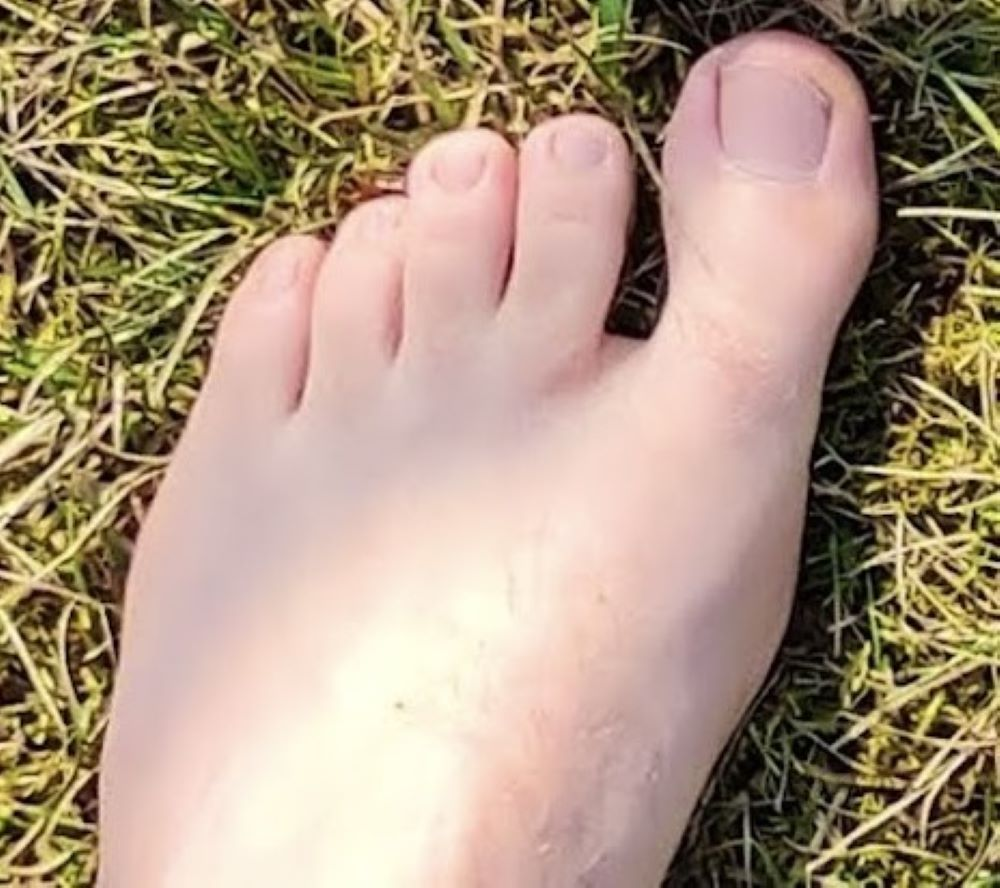
The opposite of Morton's toe is when the second toe is shorter

The metatarsal bones behind the toes are of different lengths, and the relative lengths vary between people. For most feet, a smooth curve can be traced through the joints at the bases of the toes (the metatarsal-phalangeal, or MTP, joints), but in Morton's foot, the line must bend more sharply to go through the base of the big toe, as shown in the diagram. This is because the first metatarsal, behind the big toe, is short compared to the second metatarsal, next to it. The longer second metatarsal puts the MTP joint at the base of the second toe further forward.

If the big toe and the second toe are the same length (as measured from the MTP joint to the tip, including only the toe bones or phalanges), then the second toe will protrude further than the big toe, as shown in the photo. If the second toe is shorter than the big toe, the big toe may still protrude the furthest, or there might be little difference.

== Presentation ==
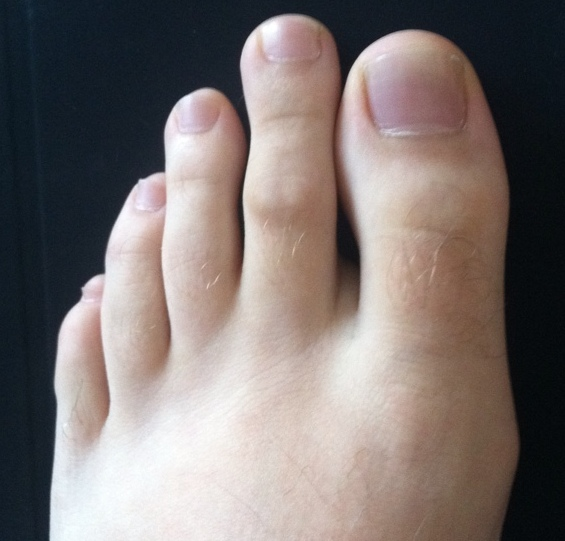
In some people with Morton's toe, the second toe is clearly longer than the big toe.

The most common symptom experienced due to Morton's toe is callusing and/or discomfort of the ball of the foot at the base of the second toe. The first metatarsal head (toeward end of the metatarsal, at the base of the big toe) would normally bear the majority of a person's body weight during the propulsive phases of gait, but since the second metatarsal head is furthest forward, the force is transferred there. Pain may also be felt in the arch of the foot, at the ankleward end of the first and second metatarsals.

In shoe-wearing cultures, Morton's toe can be problematic. For instance, wearing shoes with a profile that does not accommodate a longer second toe may cause foot pain. A small (80-person) study found no significant difference in the frequency of longer second toes between people with and without ingrown toenails, but tight and ill-fitting shoes are generally considered to increase the risk of ingrown toenails, and shoes are often too tight on the toes. A tight shoe toe box can also cause hammer toes.

=== Associated condition ===
Among the issues associated with Morton's toe is that the weight distribution causes the front of the foot to widen as the weight shifts from the first shortened toe to the others. Regular shoes will often cause metatarsalgia and neuromas as the shoe pushes together the toes hence the case of Morton's neuroma. Wide shoes are recommended.

== Treatment ==
Asymptomatic anatomical variations in feet generally do not need treatment. Conservative treatment for foot pain with Morton's toe may involve exercises or placing a flexible pad under the first toe and metatarsal. An early version of the latter treatment was once patented by Dudley Joy Morton. Restoring the Morton's toe to normal function with proprioceptive orthotics can help alleviate numerous problems of the feet such as metatarsalgia, hammer toes, bunions, Morton's neuroma, plantar fasciitis and general fatigue of the feet. Rare cases of disabling pain are sometimes treated surgically.

== Prevalence ==
Morton's toe is a minority variant of foot shape. Its recorded prevalence varies in different populations, with estimates from 2.95% to 22%. A study by the Bulgarian Academy of Sciences found that it is far more prevalent among Bulgarians. Another study on the Idoma people of Nigeria found almost a third of people have it.

== Etymology ==
The name derives from American orthopedic surgeon Dudley Joy Morton (1884–1960), who originally described it as part of Morton's triad, also known as Morton's syndrome or Morton's foot syndrome. It is a congenital short first metatarsal bone, a hypermobile first metatarsal segment, and calluses under the second and third metatarsals. Confusion has arisen from "Morton's foot" being used for a different condition, Morton's metatarsalgia, which affects the space between the bones and is named after Thomas George Morton (1835–1903).

== Culture ==
Morton's toe, especially the second-toe-is-longer versions, has a long association with disputed anthropological and ethnic interpretations. Morton called it Metatarsus atavicus, considering it an atavism recalling prehuman grasping toes. In statuary and shoe fitting, a more-protuberant second toe has been called the Greek foot (as opposed to the Egyptian foot, where the great toe is longer).

It was an idealized form in Greek sculpture (hence the common name "Greek toe"; modern Greeks also have an increased prevalence of Greek foot), and this persisted as an aesthetic standard through Roman and Renaissance times and later on in neo-classical works such as on the Statue of Liberty which has toes of this proportion. Some famous Classical and Renaissance art works featuring Morton's toe include Boxer at Rest, The Birth of Venus, Laocoön and His Sons and Diana of Versailles.

There are also associations found within Celtic groups. The French commonly call it pied grec (just as the Italians call it piede greco, both "Greek foot") but sometimes pied ancestral or pied de Néanderthal. Also in German this foot shape is called Griechischer Fuß ("Greek foot") as opposed to Ägyptischer Fuß ("Egyptian foot") where the second toe is shorter and Römischer Fuß ("Roman foot") where hallux and the second toe are of equal length.

== See also ==
- Digit ratio
- Runner's toe, repetitive injury seen in runners
