= Subungual hematoma =

- Other names: Runner's toe, tennis toe, skier's toe
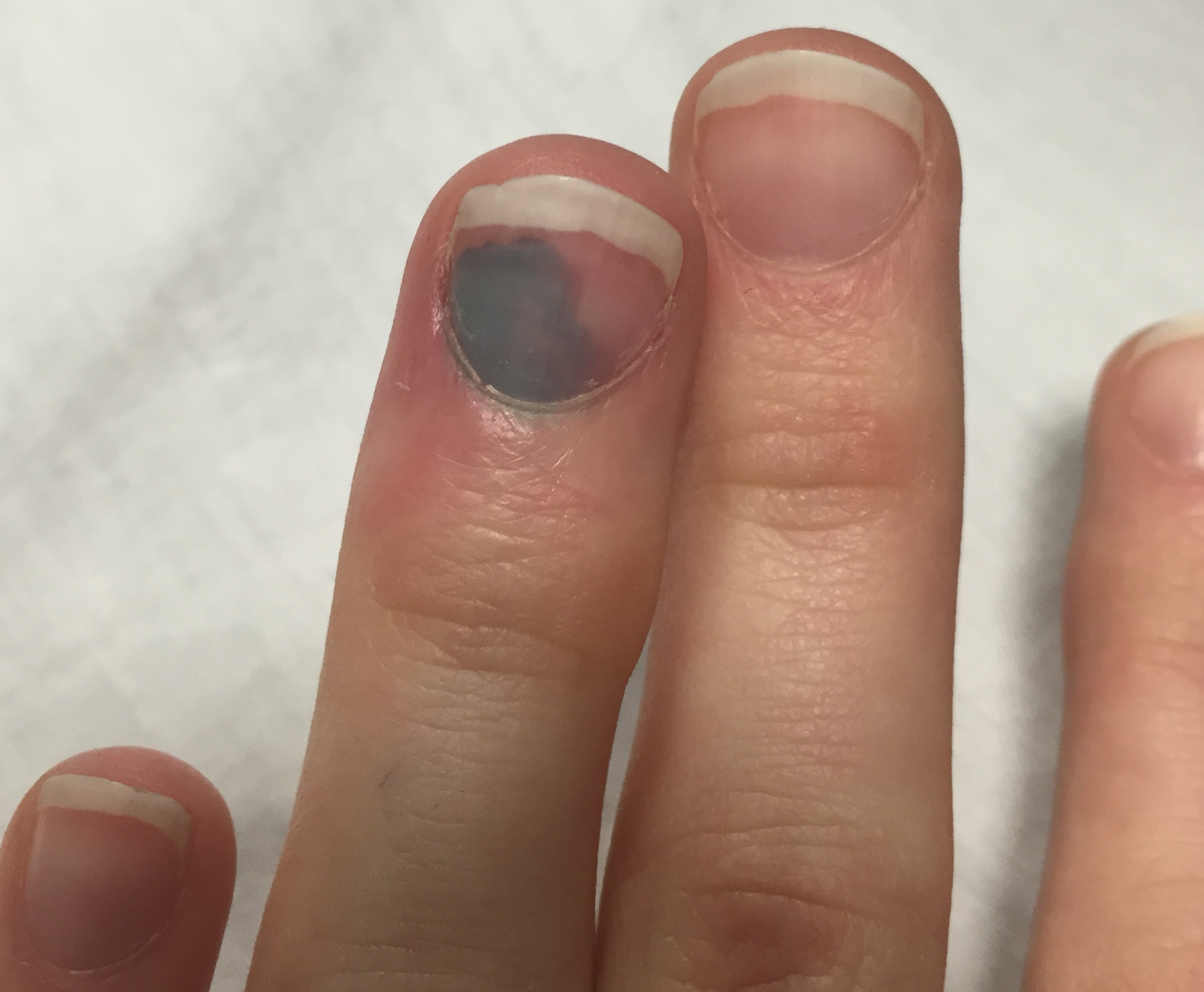
- Subungal haematoma of the fourth finger
- Specialty: Internal medicine, Podiatry
- Symptoms: Discoloration of nail, pain
- Risk factors: Poorly fitting foot wear, overtraining particularly hiking and running
- Treatment: Usually unmerited, blood drainage or nail removal in serious cases
- Prognosis: Usually self-resolving as nail grows out

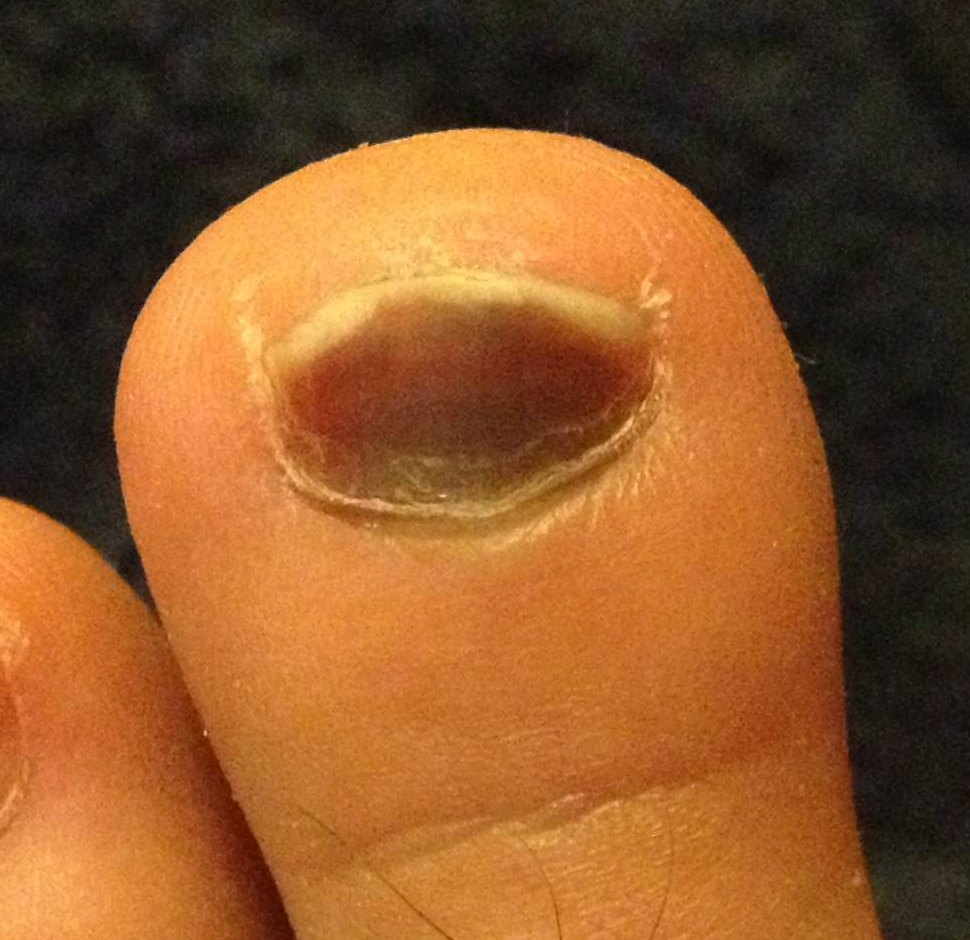
Subungal haematoma of a toe

A subungual hematoma is a collection of blood (hematoma) underneath a toenail or fingernail. It can be extremely painful for an injury of its size, although otherwise it is not a serious medical condition.

== Nature ==
A laceration of the nail bed causes bleeding into the constricted area underneath the hard nail plate. The blood pools under the nail, giving a reddish, brownish, blueish, or grey/blackish discoloration. The blood puts pressure to the nailbed causing pain which can be throbbing in quality and disappears when the pressure on the nail bed is relieved.

Subungual hematomas typically heal without incident, though infection may occur. The pressure of the blood blister may cause separation of nail plate from the nail bed (onycholysis), but the nail should not be pulled off, as this can cause scarring of the nailbed and deformed nails. Nail discolouration may last some months.

The nail plate may also become thicker and more brittle as a result of the injury (onychochauxis). The deformed nail plate will gradually grow out and be replaced by a new, normal-appearing one in several months' time. Infrequently, the nail may become painful and require surgical drainage.

== Causes ==
Right: Shoe is loose, slides. Center: Too little ease for foot to extend. Left: Proper fit

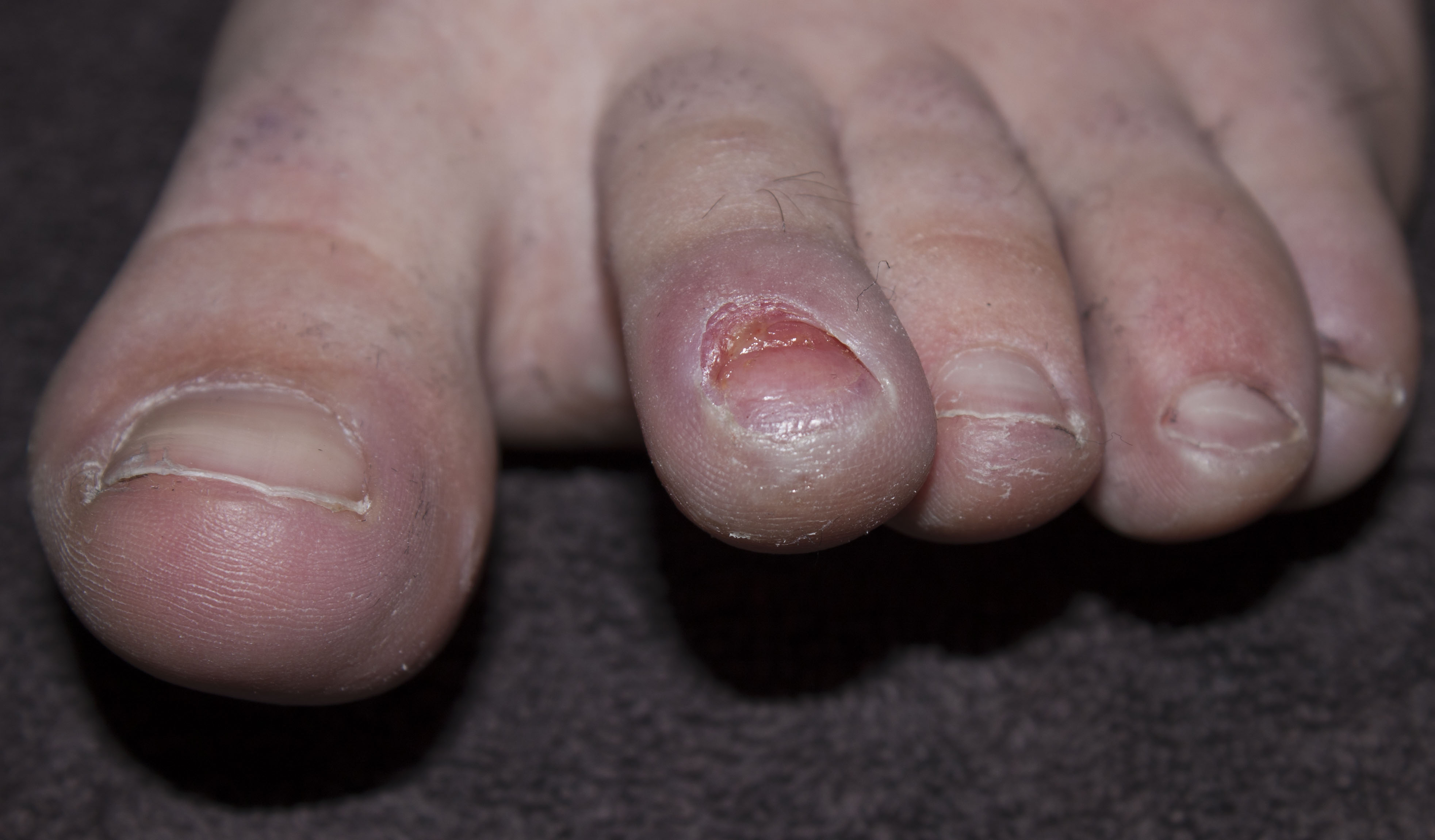
A foot which has lost a toenail, due to running injuries exacerbated by poorly-fitting shoes, badly-cut nails, and mild Morton's toe

The condition is caused by a traumatic injury, such as slamming a finger in a door, or from sports activities, especially those involving sudden accelerations, such as soccer, basketball, and tennis, or going downhill, such as running or hiking rugged terrain, and ill-fitting footwear.

Repeatedly thrusting the toes against a shoe's toe box can cause a subungual hematoma called jogger's toe, runner's toe, or black toenail. In a marathon, several percent of runners may be affected. Wearing footwear which fits helps prevent runner's toe.

If the shoe is too loose on the midfoot, the foot can slide forwards in the shoe, especially when going downhill. This may jam the toes into the end of the toebox. If the foot is sliding forwards because the shoe is too loose around the midfoot, it may be restrained by lacing the shoe carefully, or placing bulky padding between the tongue and the lacing, or by wrapping a strap in a figure-eight around the foot and ankle (image). Excessively tight or uneven fit around the midfoot may, however, cause tendon problems.

Separately, if there is not enough space around the toes, the toes will also hit the toebox repeatedly. Feet become longer and wider when weight is put on them, because the arches flatten, and the toes also splay and bend. At the end of a long journey on foot, the arches flatten, the metatarsals spread, and the foot swells more than after a short one. The toes also need vertical space; a toe cap which is low enough to press on the top of the toe may also cause bruising under the nail, especially if the toe cap is stiff. If the toebox is pointed, the toes may be wedged forwards into the area with inadequate height.

Toenails which protrude unevenly may concentrate force on the toenail; properly-cut nails are therefore also important.

Some susceptible runners may also have Morton's toe. In this variant of human foot anatomy, the second toe extends further out than the great toe. This can make it harder to find shoes with adequate space around the toes.

== Treatment ==
Subungual hematomas can resolve on their own, without treatment being necessary. If they are acutely painful, they may be drained.

Subungual hematomas are treated by either making a hole through the nail into the hematoma (trephining) within 48 hours of injury, draining the blood and releasing the pressure, or, less conservatively, by removing the entire nail.

In a hospital or medical setting, trephining is generally accomplished by using an electrocautery device or an 18-gauge needle. The hole is covered with sterile dressing and must be kept dry afterwards.

Removal of the nail is typically done when the nail itself is disrupted, a large laceration requiring suturing is suspected, or a fracture of the tip of the finger occurs. Although general anesthesia is generally not required, a digital nerve block is recommended if the nail is to be removed. For trephination, the block is often more painful than the procedure.

Complication rates from both forms of treatment are low, and the nail generally recovers to a normal appearance.

Thumb before drainage.

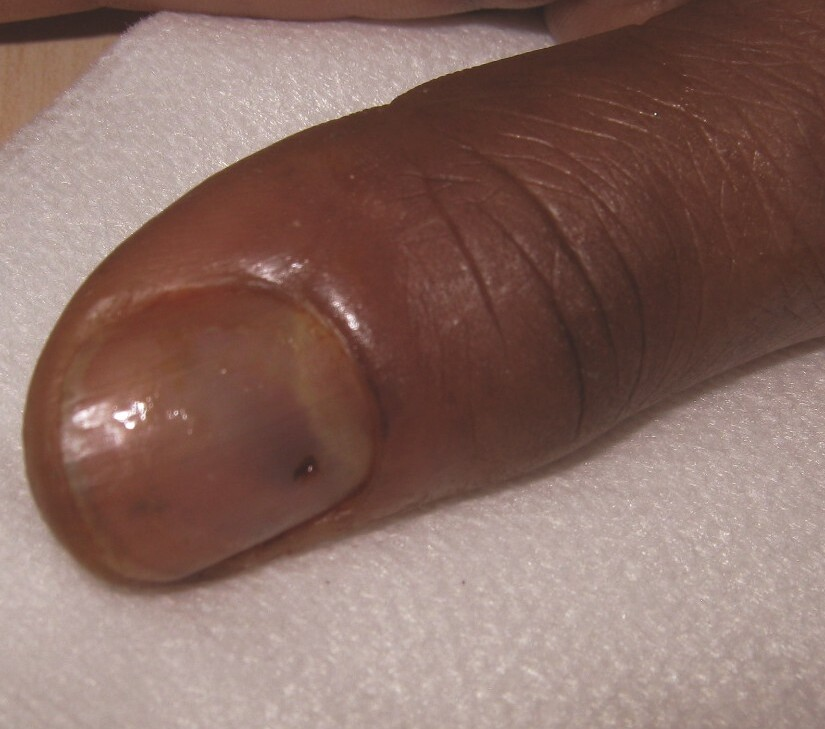
After drainage; note drainage hole.

== See also ==
- List of cutaneous conditions
- Turf toe
