= Ball (foot) =

Part of a human foot

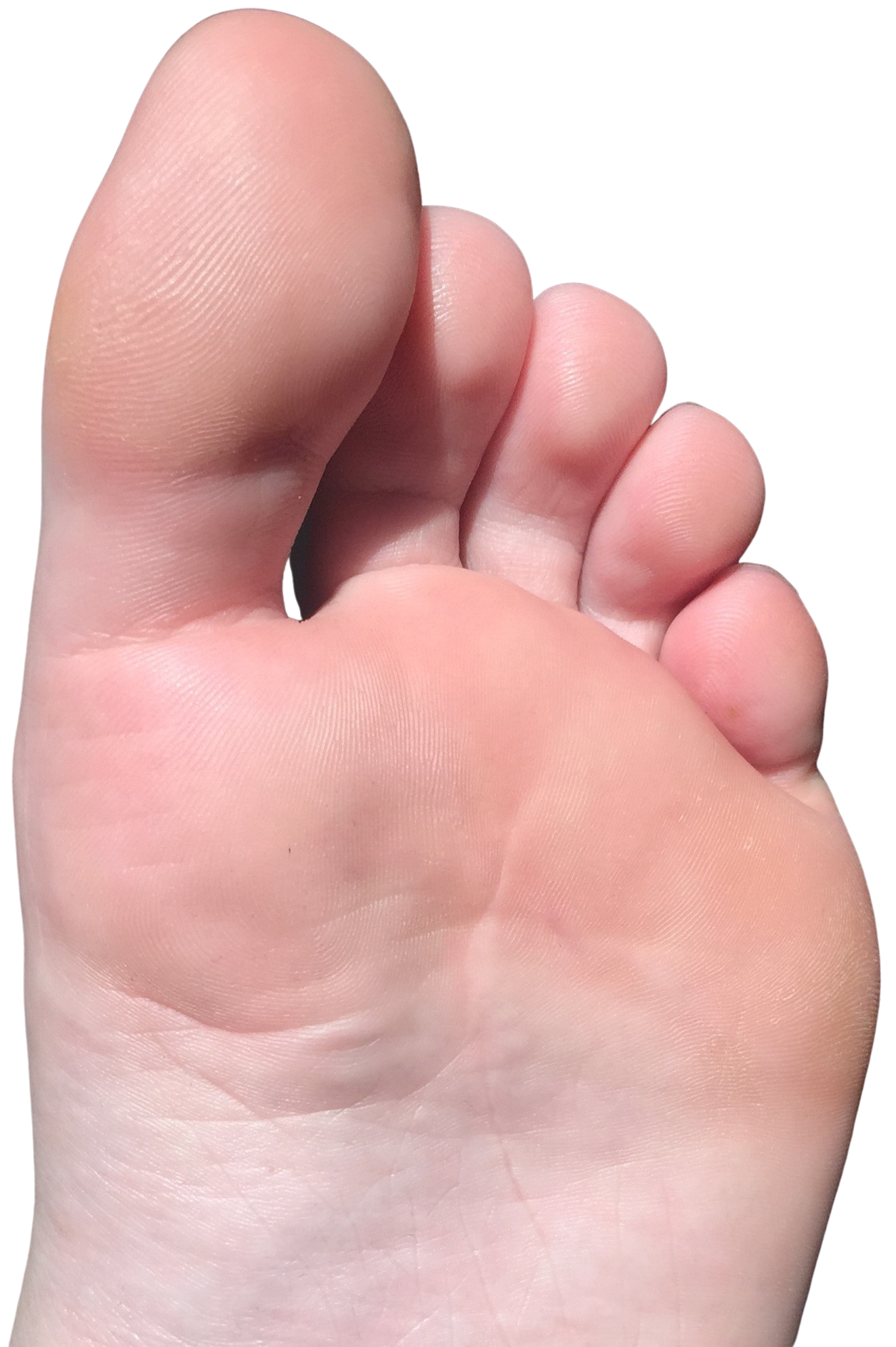
- A focus on the ball of a person's foot.
- TA2: 346

The ball of the foot is the padded portion of the sole between the toes and the arch, underneath the heads of the metatarsal bones.

In comparative foot morphology, the ball is most analogous to the metacarpal (forepaw) or metatarsal (hindpaw) pad in many mammals with paws, and serves mostly the same functions.

The ball is a common area in which people develop pain, known as metatarsalgia. People who frequently wear high heels often develop pain in the balls of their feet from the immense amount of pressure that is placed on them for long periods of time, due to the inclination of the shoes. To remedy this, there is a market for ball-of-foot or general foot cushions that are placed into shoes to relieve some of the pressure. Alternately, people can have a procedure done in which a dermal filler is injected into the balls of the feet to add cushioning.

== See also ==
- Fat pad
- Metatarsophalangeal joint
- Tactile pad
