= Foot deformity =

- Specialty: Medical genetics

A foot deformity is a disorder of the foot that can be congenital or acquired.

Such deformities can include hammer toe, club foot, flat feet, pes cavus, etc.
