= Metatarsophalangeal joint sprain =

- Bones of the right foot; metatarsalphalangeal joints highlighted in an orange box
- Specialty: Podiatry

A metatarsophalangeal joint sprain is an injury to the connective tissue between the foot and a toe (at a metatarsophalangeal joint, one of the joints in the ball of the foot). When the big toe is involved, it is known as "turf toe".

== Causes ==
Turf toe is named from the injury being associated with playing sports on rigid surfaces such as artificial turf and is a fairly common injury among professional American football players. Often, the injury occurs when someone or something falls on the back of the calf while that leg's knee and tips of the toes are touching the ground. The toe is hyperextended and thus the joint is injured. Additionally, athletic shoes with very flexible soles combined with cleats that "grab" the turf will cause overextension of the big toe. This can occur on the lesser toes as well. It has also been observed in sports beyond American football, including soccer, baseball, basketball, rugby, volleyball, and tae kwon do. This is a primary reason why many athletes prefer natural grass to turf, because it is softer. Because of its benign sounding nickname, relative to the severe pain that it can cause, some in the medical community refer to "turf toe" as "death toe".

== Treatment ==
The injury can be debilitating for athletes of many sports who need to accelerate, quickly change direction, or jump. Use of the toes is not possible during the healing process. Since the toes are necessary for proper push-off when accelerating, those sorts of athletic activities should be almost completely curtailed. An extended healing period of one or more months is often required.

Because of the anatomy of the distal foot and the unique use of the foot, it is often impossible to properly tape or brace the joint. Although difficult, it is not impossible to tape the toe to limit extension (upward bend of toe). Additionally, wearing a shoe with a rigid sole (often a metal plate) and cushioned innersole will help minimize extension of the joint. Anti-inflammatory medication, as well as physical therapy, is recommended.

Turf toe is usually healed in about 2–3 weeks. It can become more serious if left untreated, and may cause serious problems for the athlete. Treating the injury includes icing of the area, elevating the foot, or possibly the use of custom orthotics.

== See also ==
- Broken toe
- Jogger's toe
