= Brachymetatarsia =

- Other names: Hypoplastic metatarsal
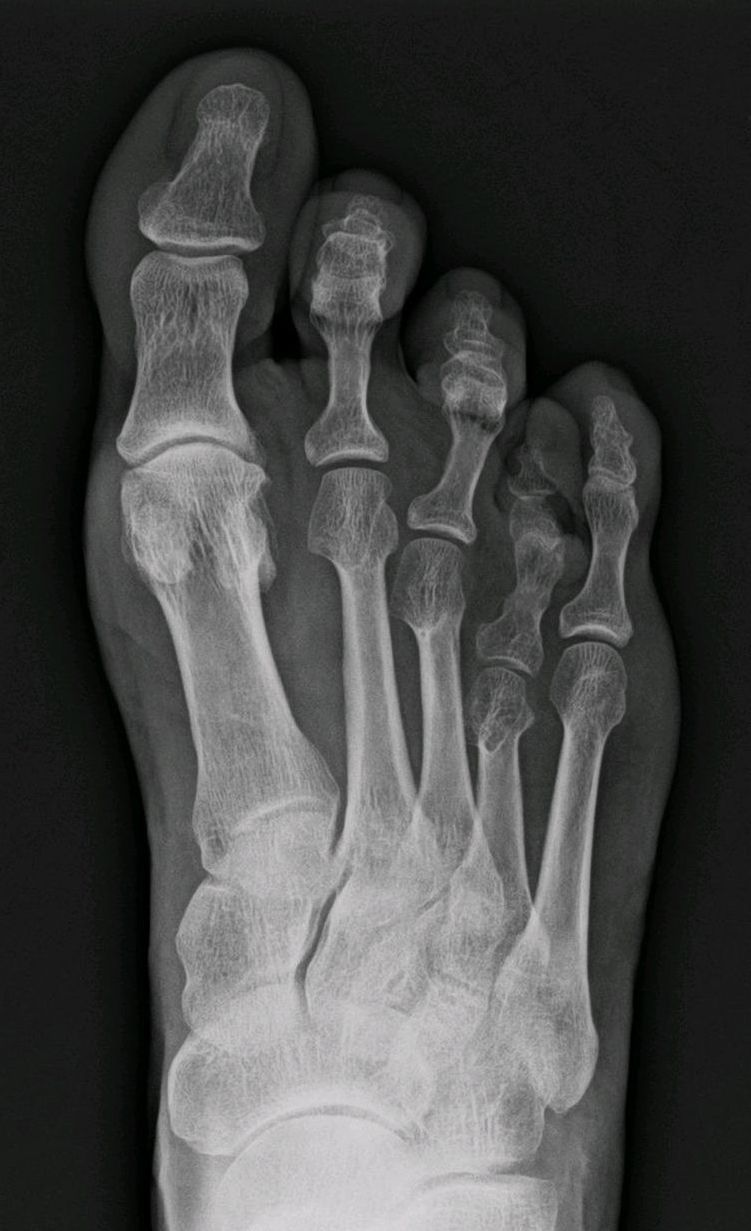
- X-ray of congenital brachymetatarsia involving fourth metatarsal bone
- Specialty: Medical genetics, rheumatology
- Symptoms: Discomfort with shoe wearing

Brachymetatarsia is a rare malformation that causes one or more toes to be abnormally short. The condition is characterized by a metatarsal arch shortness of more than 5 mm. The condition is more common in females, and the condition is reported in literature ranges from 0.02% to 0.05%. Brachymetatarsia appears to be the result of epiphyseal plate retardation or premature closure. The etiology may be congenital and idiopathic, posttraumatic, postinfection, iatrogenic, or secondary to a systemic disease such as cancer, sickle cell disease, pseudohyperparathyroidism, Turner's syndrome, Down syndrome, Apert syndrome, athyroidism, or osteodystrophy.

It most frequently involves the fourth metatarsal. If it involves the first metatarsal, the condition is known as Morton's syndrome. Treatment is via a number of differing surgical procedures.

== Diagnosis ==
=== Differential diagnosis ===
Congenital causes include: Aarskog syndrome, Turner syndrome, Albright's hereditary osteodystrophy, maternal ingestion of thalidomide during pregnancy and Apert syndrome. Can be caused by a trauma, although the exact mechanism is not known.

== Treatment ==
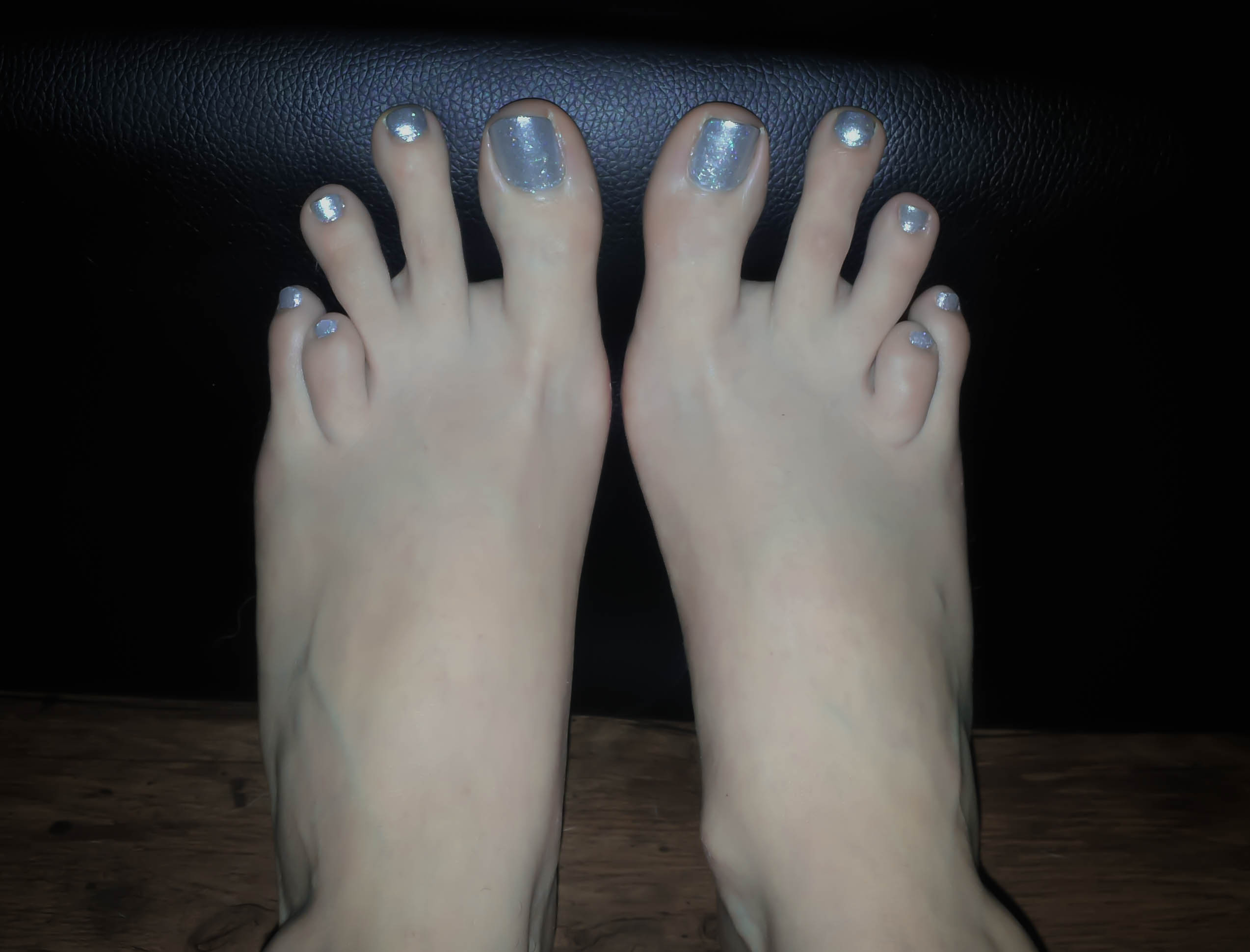
Bilateral brachymetatarsia of the fourth metatarsal

Symptoms may be treated by wearing wider shoes to relieve pressure, or the patient can wear padding around the toes. Surgery is also an option, if the pain and discomfort cannot be treated, or for cosmetic reasons. In this procedure, the short metatarsal is typically cut and a piece of bone is grafted between the two ends. In some cases, an external fixator may be attached to the metatarsal with pins. Within the external fixator is an adjustable screw that must be turned (per doctors' orders) to lengthen the gap between bone segments, so the bone will regrow to the appropriate shape.

Following surgery, crutches or a knee scooter should be used to keep all weight off the surgically repaired foot for 3 months. After this period, orthopedic shoes or boots may be used.

== Epidemiology ==
Brachymetatarsia is found to occur more frequently in women than men. Brachymetatarsia affecting the first metatarsal of the foot is the most common type of brachymetatarsia, with approximately 22% of the population being affected by it.
