= Hammer toe =

Rigidly clenched toe due to deformity of related muscles or ligaments

- Other names: Contracted toe
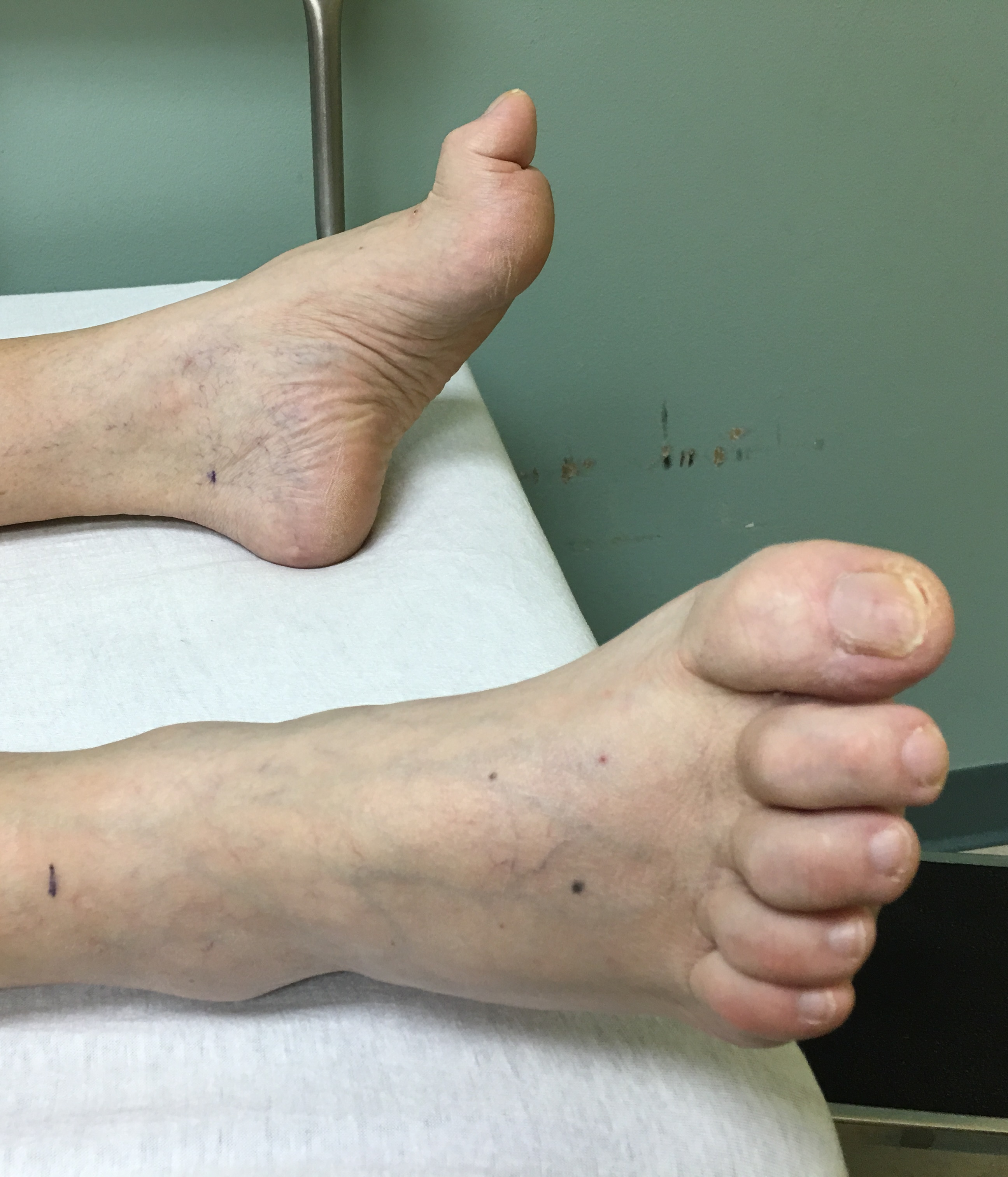
- Human feet with hammer toes
- Specialty: Podology, orthopedic surgery

A hammer toe, hammertoe or contracted toe is a deformity of the muscles and ligaments of the proximal interphalangeal joint of the second, third, fourth, or fifth toe, bending it into a shape resembling a hammer. In the early stage, a flexible hammertoe is movable at the joints; a rigid hammertoe joint cannot be moved and usually requires surgery.

Mallet toe is a similar condition affecting the distal interphalangeal joint.

Claw toe is another similar condition, with dorsiflexion of the proximal phalanx on the lesser metatarsophalangeal joint, combined with flexion of both the proximal and distal interphalangeal joints. Claw toe can affect the second, third, fourth, or fifth toes.

== Types ==
There are three types of hammer toe, as categorized by podiatrists.

- Flexible hammer toes are where patients are still able to bend and move the affected toes, but where a noticeable curl has begun to form.
- Semi-rigid hammer toes are where the affected toes are hard to bend and are noticeably stiff.
- Rigid hammer toes are frozen in a curled position. These are most likely to require surgery.

== Risk factors ==
Older people are more likely to develop hammer toes. Women are at higher risk, due to the construction of women's shoes. Injuries to the toes, and being born with a big toe that is short in comparison to the second toe, increase risk. Arthritis and diabetes may also increase the risk of foot deformities.

== Causes ==
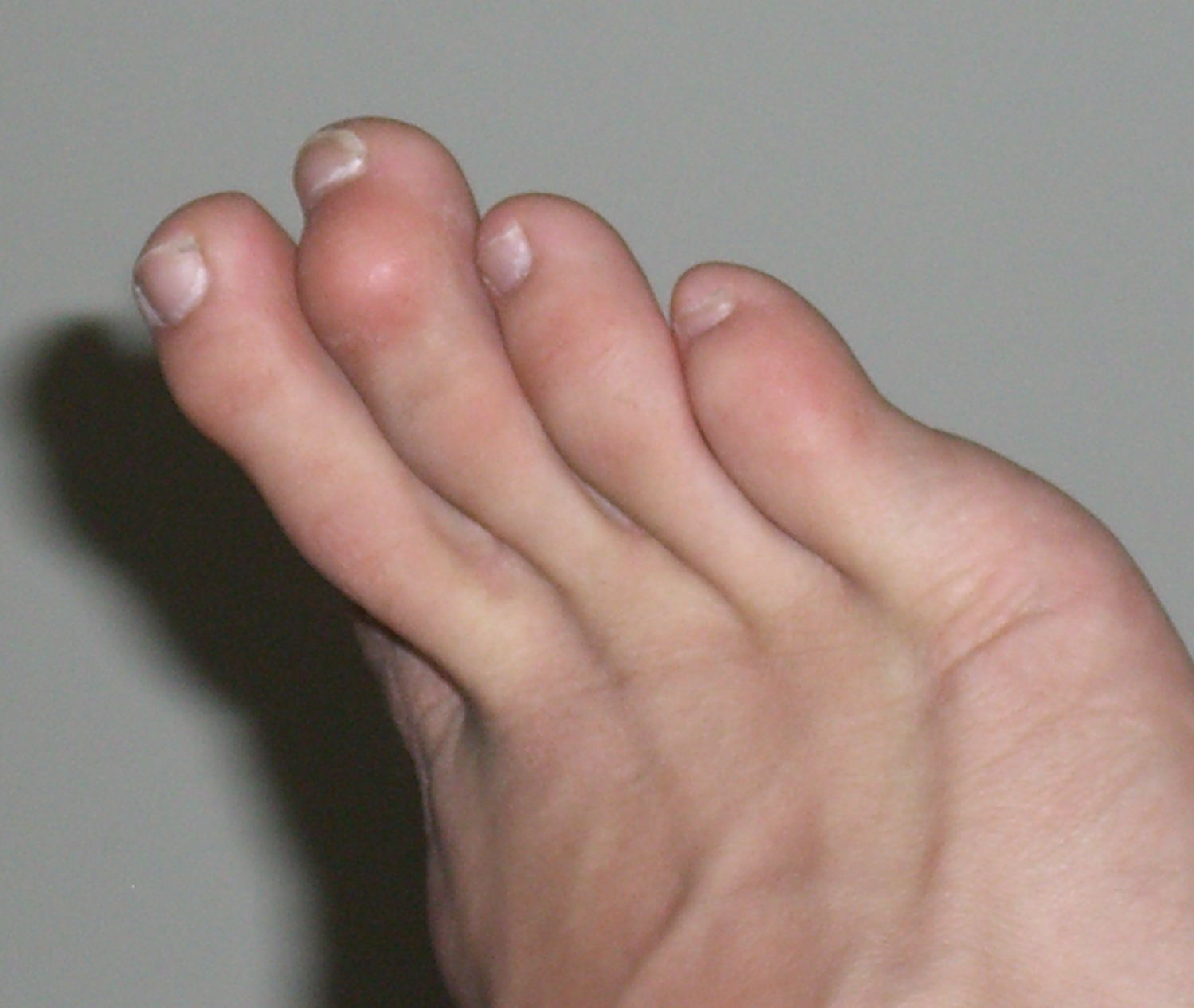
A mallet toe is evident on the 3rd digit.

Hammertoes and clawtoes have multiple causes. Hammer toe most frequently results from wearing poorly fitting shoes that can force the toe into a bent position, such as high heels or shoes that are too short or narrow for the foot. Having the toes bent for long periods of time can cause the muscles in them to shorten, resulting in the hammer toe deformity. This is often found in conjunction with bunions or other foot problems (e.g., a bunion can force the big toe to turn inward and push the other toes).

The toe muscles work in pairs; if the muscles pulling in one direction are much weaker than those pulling in the other direction, the imbalance can bend the toe. If the bend persists, then as the tendons and ligaments tighten (as they do if not stretched), the bend may become permanent. Ill-fitting shoes are especially likely to push the toes out of balance.

Toe deformities can also be caused by muscle, nerve, or joint damage, resulting from conditions such as osteoarthritis, rheumatoid arthritis, stroke, Charcot–Marie–Tooth disease, complex regional pain syndrome or diabetes. Hammer toe can also be found in Friedreich's ataxia (GAA trinucleotide repeat).

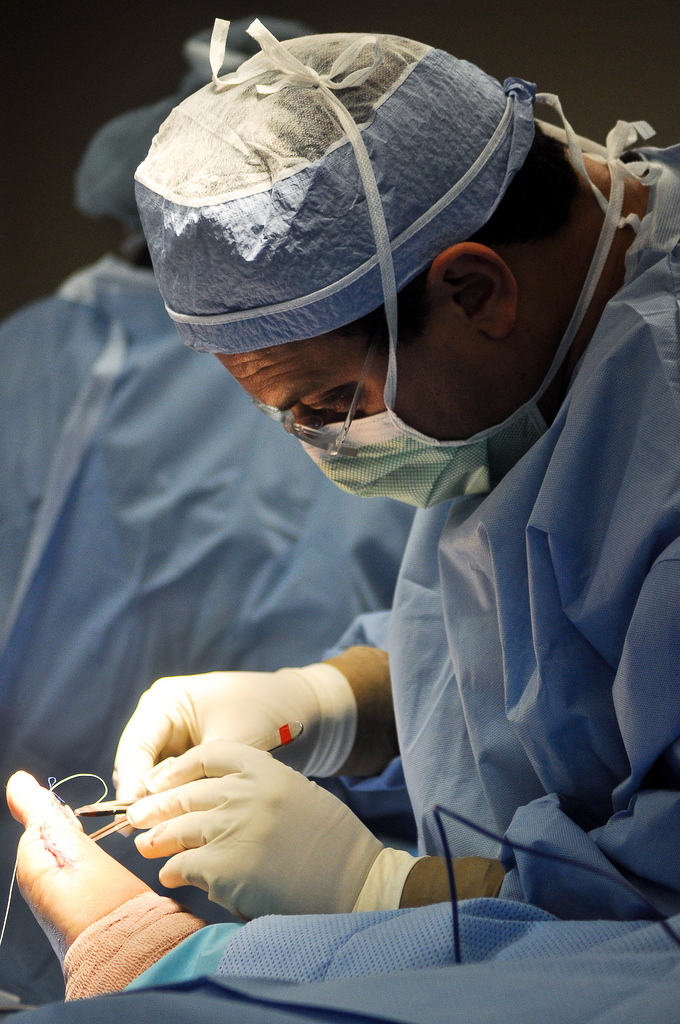
Corrective surgery for hammer toe

== Treatment ==
In many cases, conservative treatment consisting of physical therapy and new shoes with soft, spacious toe boxes is enough to resolve the condition, while in more severe or longstanding cases hammertoe surgery may be necessary to correct the deformity. The patient's doctor may also prescribe some toe exercises that can be done at home to stretch and strengthen the muscles. For example, the individual can gently stretch the toes manually, or use the toes to pick things up off the floor.
