= Metatarsalgia =

- Other names: Stone bruise
- Specialty: Orthopedics

Metatarsalgia, literally 'metatarsal pain' and colloquially known as a stone bruise, is any painful foot condition affecting the metatarsal region of the foot. This is a common problem that can affect the joints and bones of the metatarsals.

Metatarsalgia is most often localized to the first metatarsal head – the ball of the foot just behind the big toe. There are two small sesamoid bones under the first metatarsal head. The next most frequent site of metatarsal head pain is under the second metatarsal. This can be due to either too short a first metatarsal bone or to "hypermobility of the first ray" – metatarsal bone and medial cuneiform bone behind it – both of which result in excess pressure being transmitted into the second metatarsal head.

== Symptoms ==
Metatarsalgia is characterized by a sharp pain in the ball of the foot.

== Causes ==
One cause of metatarsalgia is Morton's neuroma. When toes are squeezed together too often and for too long, the nerve that runs between the toes can swell and get thicker. This swelling can make it painful when walking on that foot. High-heeled, tight, or narrow shoes can make pain worse. This is common in runners, particularly of long distance. The ball of the foot takes a lot of weight over the years and if running on pavement or running in ill-fitting running shoes, the odds of developing Morton's neuroma increase. Changing to shoes that give the toes more room can help.

== Diagnosis ==
Diagnosis is often done by patient self-report.

If a patient feels pain in the ball of the foot a podiatrist is the best source for a diagnosis. A podiatrist is a trained expert who can offer treatment options.

== Treatment ==
The most common treatments are:

- Rest
- Ice
- NSAIDs
- Properly fitted shoes
- Metatarsal pads
- Arch supports

Removing excess callouses may be helpful. In extreme cases, injection or surgery may be indicated.
