= Kastelskirken =

Coordinates: 55°41′29″N 12°35′34.6″E

Kastelskirken (Citadel Church)
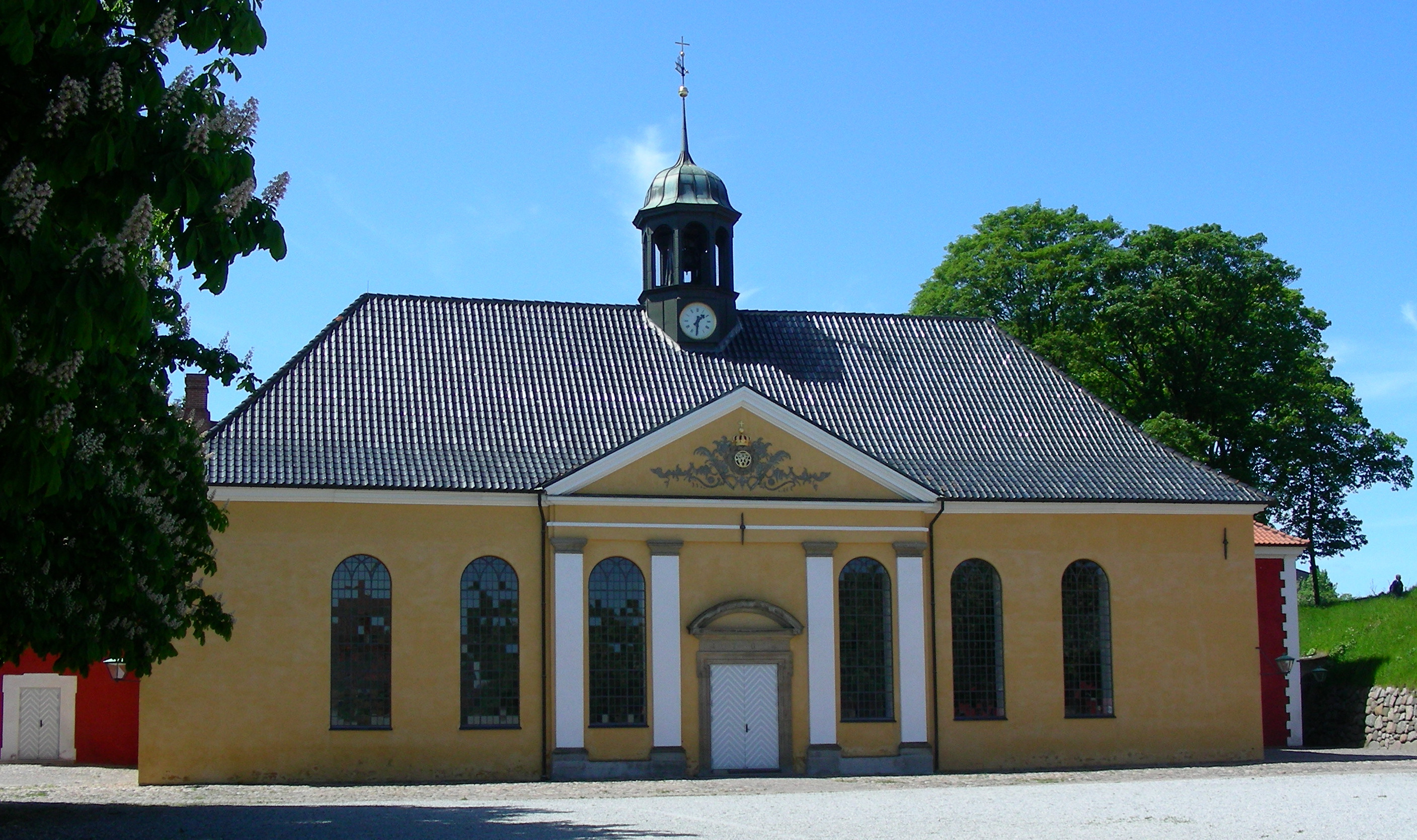
- Front view of the Citadel Church
- Kastelskirken (Citadel Church)
- Location: Kastellet 50, 2100 Copenhagen
- Country: Denmark
- Website: www.kastelskirken.dk

History
- Consecrated: 1704

Architecture
- Architect: G.P. Müller
- Style: Baroque
- Years built: 1703-04

Administration
- Diocese: Diocese of Copenhagen
- Parish: Citadel Parish

The Citadel Church (in Danish: Kastelskirken) is located in the Kastellet (Citadel "Frederikshavn") in Copenhagen, the capital of Denmark. The church was originally reserved for the garrison of the castle, but in 1902 also incorporated a civil parish. The Citadel Church celebrated its 300th anniversary in 2004.

== History ==
=== Ruse's plan ===
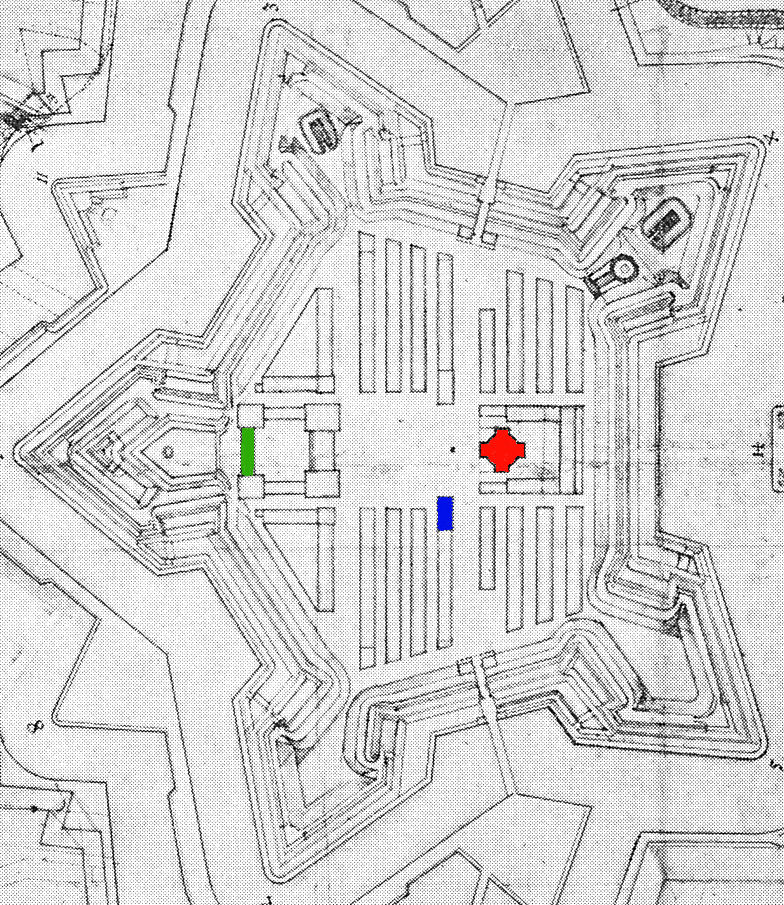
Ruse's plan from about 1661

On Henrik Ruse's plan of the Citadel from about 1661, a building (marked in red) is inscribed in the drawing, east of the site, with a floor plan that can almost only belong to a church. However, no church was mentioned in Ruse's contracts, nor are there any drawings for anyone from Ruse's hand. There is a drawing at the National Museum of Denmark of a church erected with Frederick III of Denmark's monogram, which places it in the correct time period and which fits on Ruse's floor plan, but since the church was never built, it is more of academic interest. However, it has been used in a visualization of Ruse's plan.

=== The first Citadel Church ===
The information about the first church of the castle is sparse. North of the Artillery Stick, Ruse had erected a command house (marked in blue on the drawing) of recycled materials from the old customs warehouse. It can be seen on the plan as an extension that goes further into the alarm area than the other sticks. However, the house was a short distance from the log.

The house was described as having a basement walled basement, two-storey half-timbered building and full roof. After the completion of the plant around the turn of the year 1666-67, the building remained unused until the church moved in somewhere between 1672 and 1676. The church was on the first floor ("other logging"), with an outside staircase.

In 1696, the chief of fortification, Hans Erasmus von der Pfordten, drew up a proposal to redevelop the house into something very similar to the present church, just less. It was previously believed that von der Pfordten himself had worked as an architect on the proposal, but information obtained in connection with [Garrison's Church] indicates that it was the same man, the engineering officer Georg Philip Müller, who designed both churches. The rebuilding was not carried out, it was sufficient to repair the need, in anticipation of a new and larger church being built.

In 1699, a bell stack was erected at the north end of the church.

=== The history of the present Citadel Church ===
In 1697, von der Pfordten proposes that a new church be built west of the Alarm Square along the Royal Bastion, where it is today (marked with green on Ruse's drawing). The project is so similar to the proposal for the redevelopment of the first church that we must assume that G.P. Müller was the architect of it again. Construction began in 1703 under the direction of "contractor", Domenico Pelli, and was completed in 1704, when the church was inaugurated on November 26.

The drawings for the church have been lost, and the oldest drawings we have come from Chr. Goede's survey in 1754, where the prison was built.

The date when the copper roof was replaced with brick is not known, perhaps in 1722 when there were windows – two on each long side and one on each short side – perhaps in 1725, when the prison was built. The attic windows had disappeared again by the great redevelopment in 1857.

The prison, which in 1725 was being built up to the west side of the church, blocks the four west-facing windows, but nothing more than that still some light falls on the western pulpit. A system of sound channels was constructed from the church into the prison so that the prisoners could follow the services of their cells.

In 1750, more was added around the monogram in the frontispiece. In 1961, it was all renewed.

From the time between 1750 and 1850, there is almost no information available on the church, partly because the archdiocese's archives were lost during the English occupation of the Citadel in 1807.

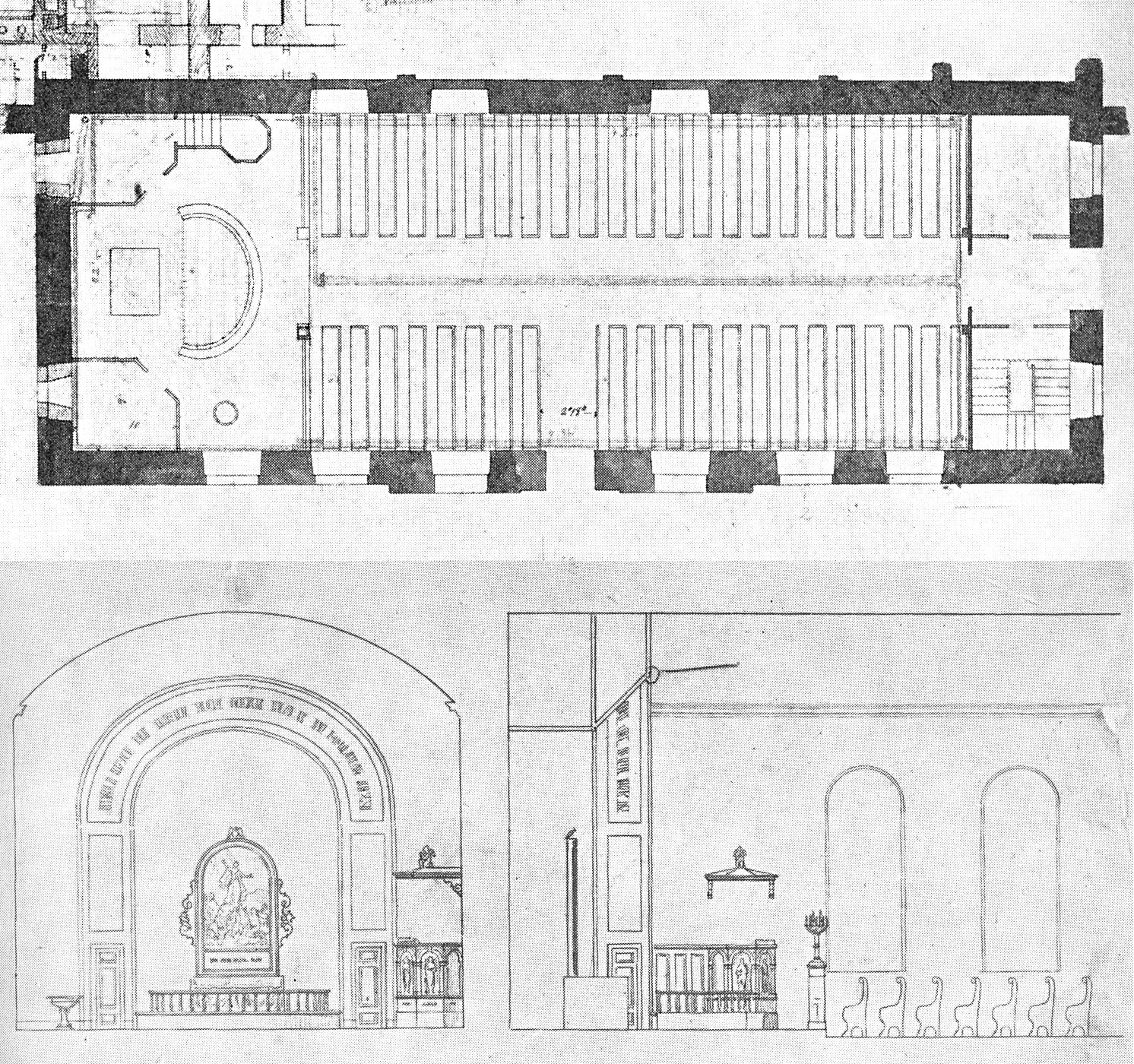
Remodeling in 1857

In 1857, a city architect, Niels Sigfred Nebelong, started a major redevelopment. He was also supposed to have devised the plans. In this rebuild, the pulpits were removed along the long sides, replaced the chairs with new (oak-coloured) and laid a plank floor. The chairs along the east wall were led through so the door was locked. The windows on the west side and the sound channels were completely rebuilt and a new pulpit was erected.

Probably the most significant of Nebelong's changes was the new alternative. The southern end wall was drawn out so that a rounded niche could be formed around the altarpiece (see drawing). Thereby two small rooms were formed, one on each side of the altar, which served as a priest and writing chair. The drawing also shows a new altarpiece that was apparently made (it still exists) but never used. After this conversion, the church receives only daylight from the east wall windows.

In the next hundred years, the major changes in the appearance of the building will not occur. In 1880, the north portal was changed to resemble the east portal. In 1895, a fire in the boiler room spread to the roof, which must then have been at least partially replaced. In 1905 the text "I am the way of truth and life" is placed on architrave one over the east portal. The same year, the glam holes in the spiral, which have previously been partially closed, are opened. Inside, the ceiling vault is covered with blue painted boards in 1950.

In 1969, the church got a new organ, which does not cover the entire back wall, so the north windows again shed light on the organ pulpit.

In 1985, an extensive restoration of the building began. The roof structure was found to have been attacked by fungus, and large parts of the woodwork had to be replaced, as was the upper part of the wall crown. The church room was brought back, if not to its original appearance, then to its original style. Most of Nebelong's changes were removed and only his pulpit was preserved. The two rooms at the south end were removed. Instead, clergy and parish rooms were set up in the former prison, and doors were made between the two buildings. The rooms on each side of the porch were closed, and the porch – which is closer to a porch – was lined with wooden panels that matched the gables of the new chairs. The chairs were opened again so that the east door could be used. See also the description and pictures of the church building below.

The church was inaugurated in March 1987. In 1988, the church received Europa Nostra's bronze plaque for the restoration.

== Church building ==
The Citadel Church today appears as a simple Baroque building without the great decoration. The masonry is whitewashed yellow and the roof is covered with black glazed bricks. The "tower" – it's more like a [roof rider] – is lined with copper, and the wing bar details are gilded. The wing bar ends in a cross, which is really the only thing that reveals that the building is a church. Above the east door is the building year 1704, the inscription from 1905 is gone again. Although the east door is no longer locked, the north entrance is normally used. The north entrance portal from 1880 is preserved.

The church room appears very simple, adjacent to the Spartan. The walls and ceiling are white, the woodwork is pearl grey with gilded details, and the floor is covered with greyish tiles. Under the chairs, there is a slightly raised plank floor. Except for the altarpiece, only colours other than grey, white, and gold, are found on the organ facade, the cushions of the chairs and the kneeling.

The church room has no decoration drilled from what is on the normal church furniture parts (see below). (On the day that one photograph was taken, however, roses were adorned on the headboards.) nowadays, 10 of the original 14 windows provide light to the main church room. The four facing the prison are still walled, but the sound holes have been reopened to the prison.

The rows of chairs go all the way to the choir, which is raised two steps, so there is no actual choir counter.

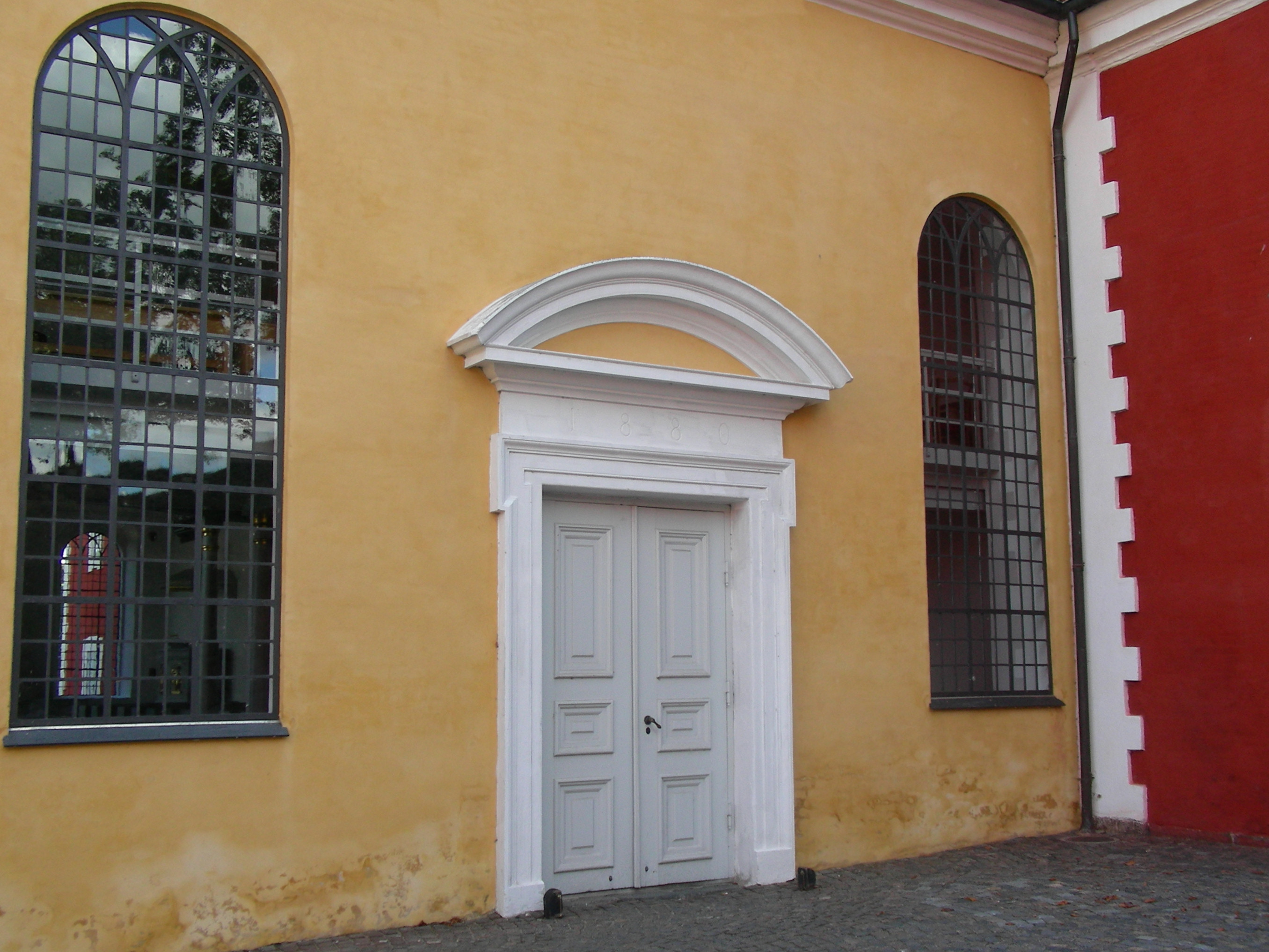
The North Portal from 1880

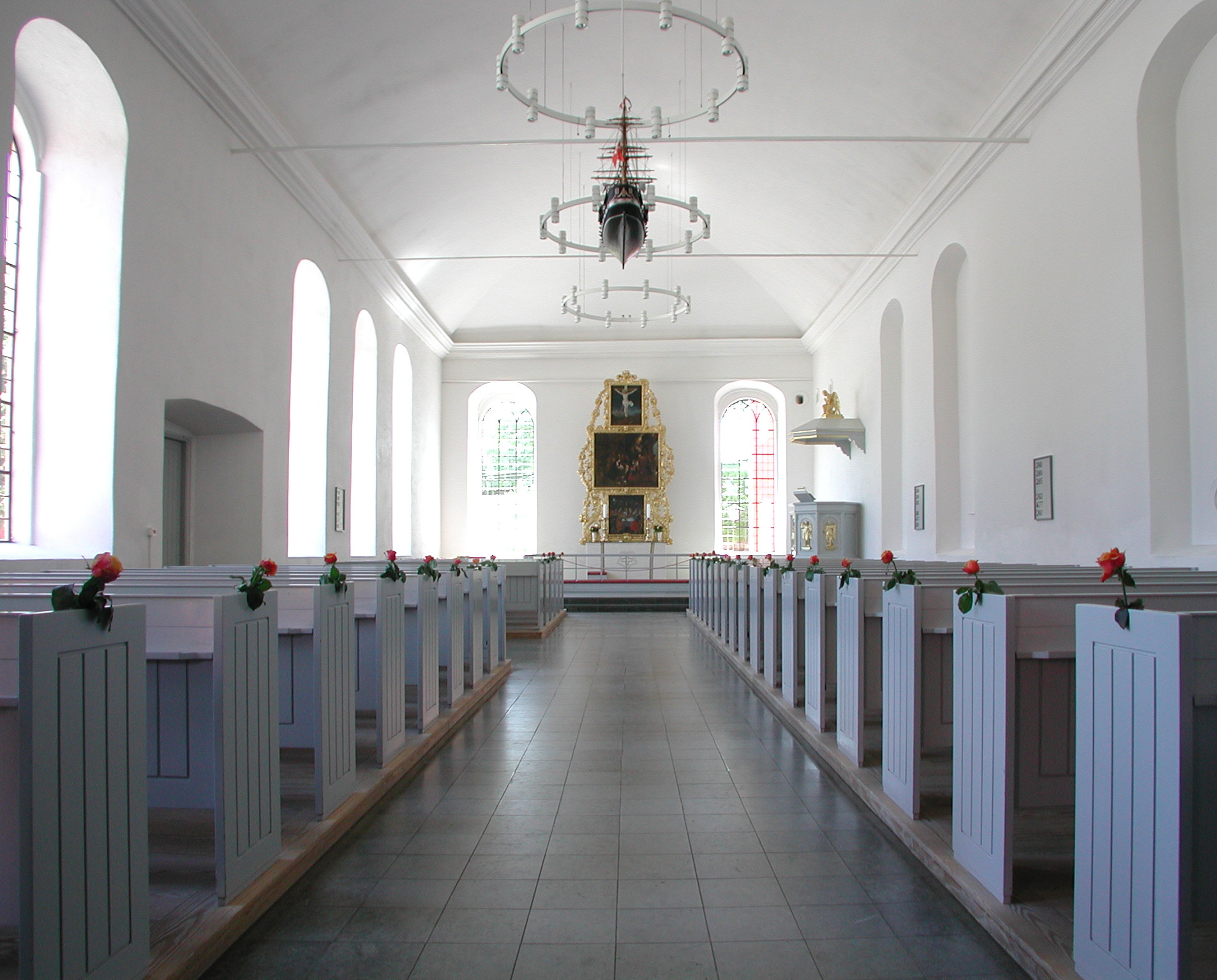
Church room facing altar (south)

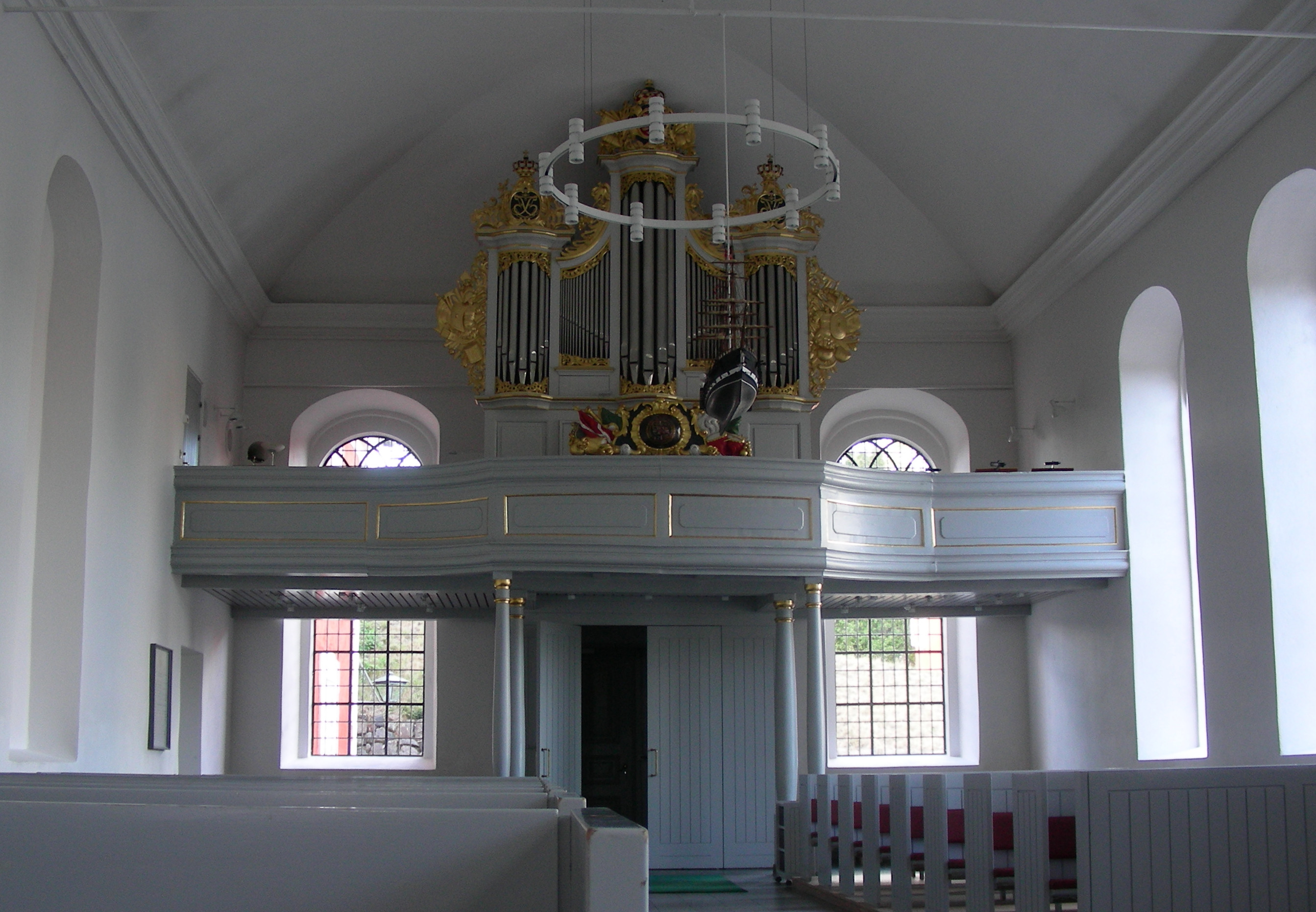
Church room facing organ (north)

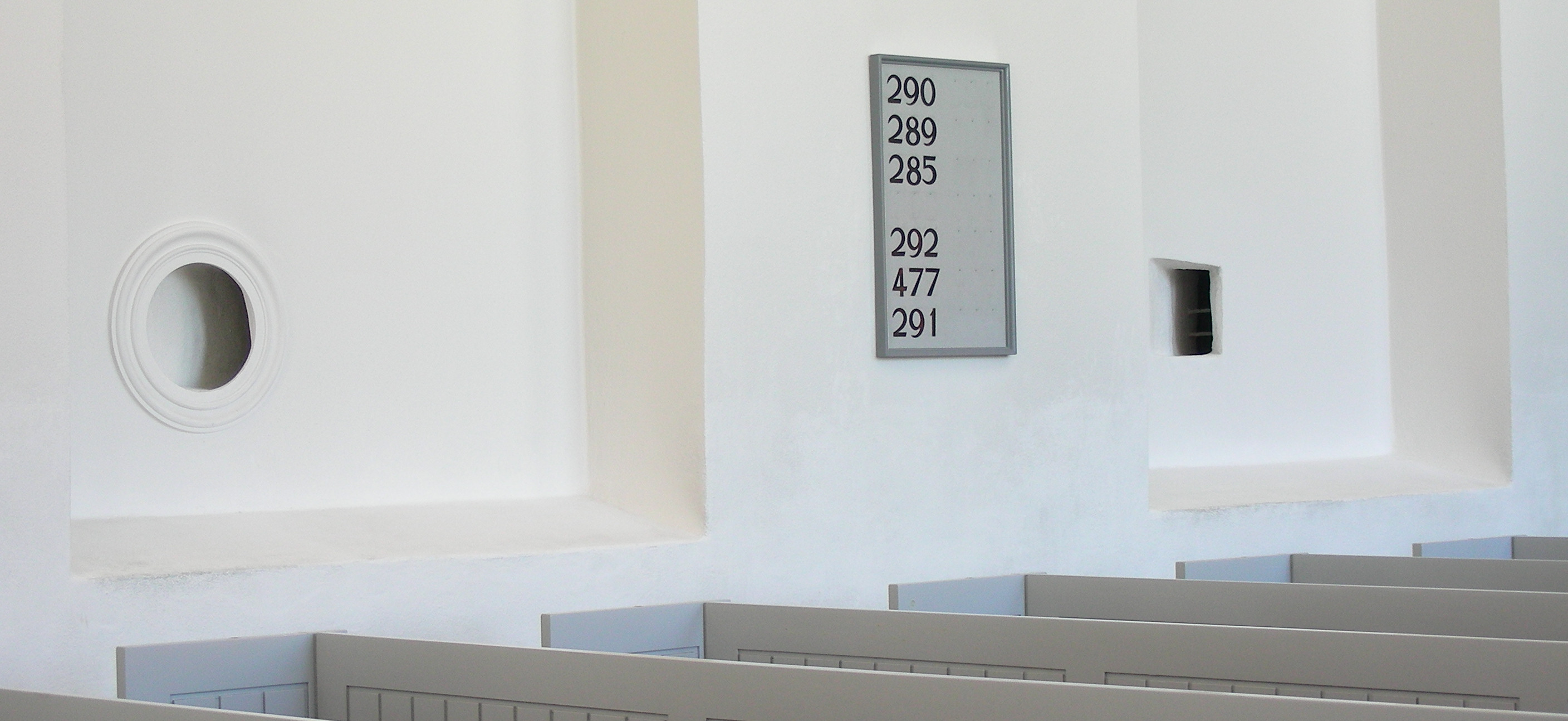
Sound holes

== Interior ==
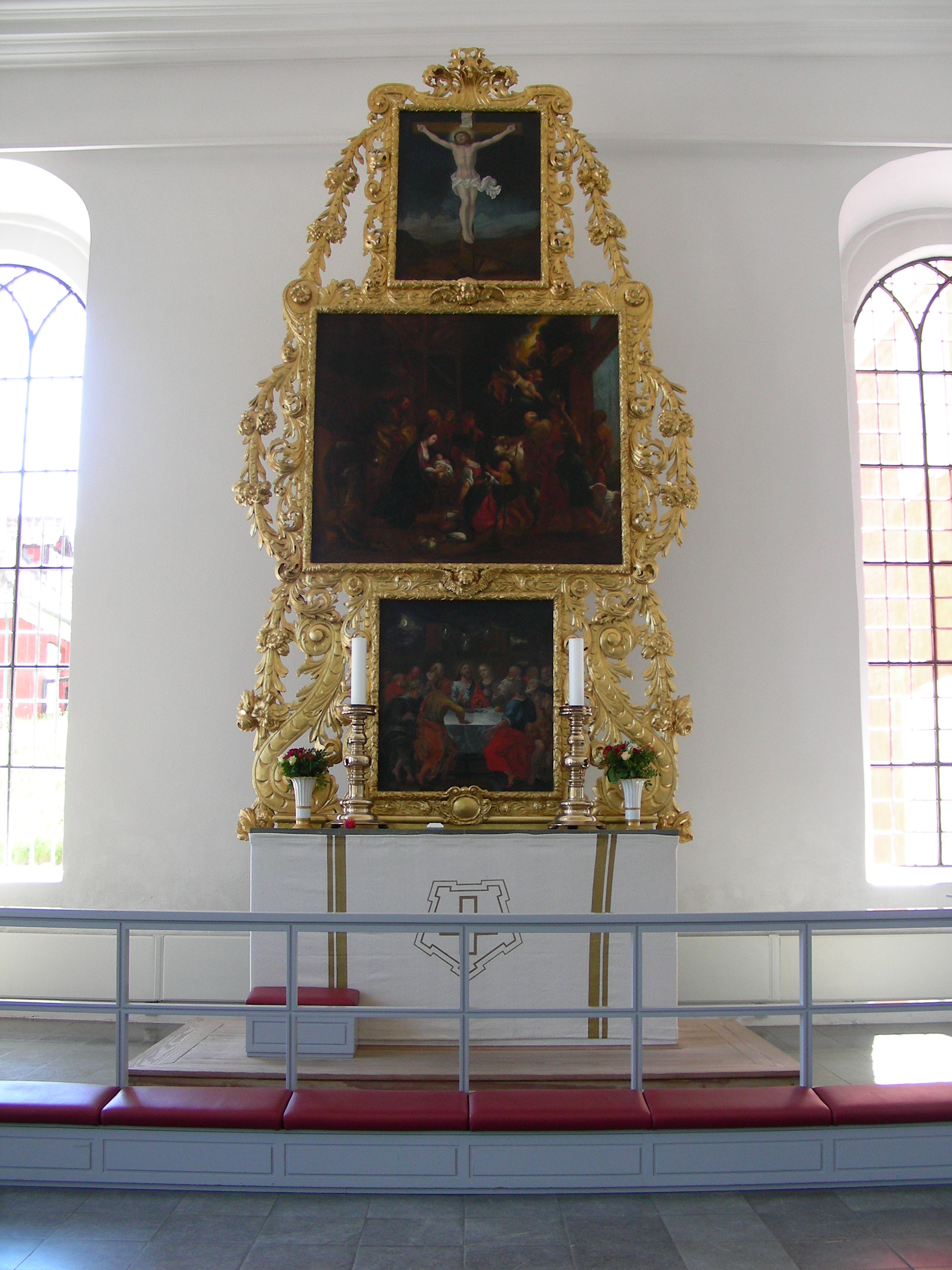
Altarpiece

=== Altar ===
The altarpiece consists of three oil paintings inserted over one another in a carved gilded wooden frame. The cutter is unknown. It stems from the church's construction, but the paintings are older.

The large painting in the middle – The Shepherd's Worship – is very likely identical to the altarpiece of the first Citadel Church. It was made in the latter half of the 17th century. The lower image – The Last Supper – is stylistically similar to other church images dating from about 1700. The upper image – Christ on the Cross – dates from the late 1600s.

The altar is adorned with the Citadel's own 'logo': a Greek cross in a stylized outline of the five bastions of the Citadel.

The church also has an altarpiece from about 1860, probably part of Nebelong's redevelopment, but it has never been erected in the church. It is a painting of Lucie Ingemann depicting Christ as the King of Heaven, receiving the souls of the deceased. The painting is inserted in a newly Gothic oak frame of 3.2 meters by 1.47 meters.

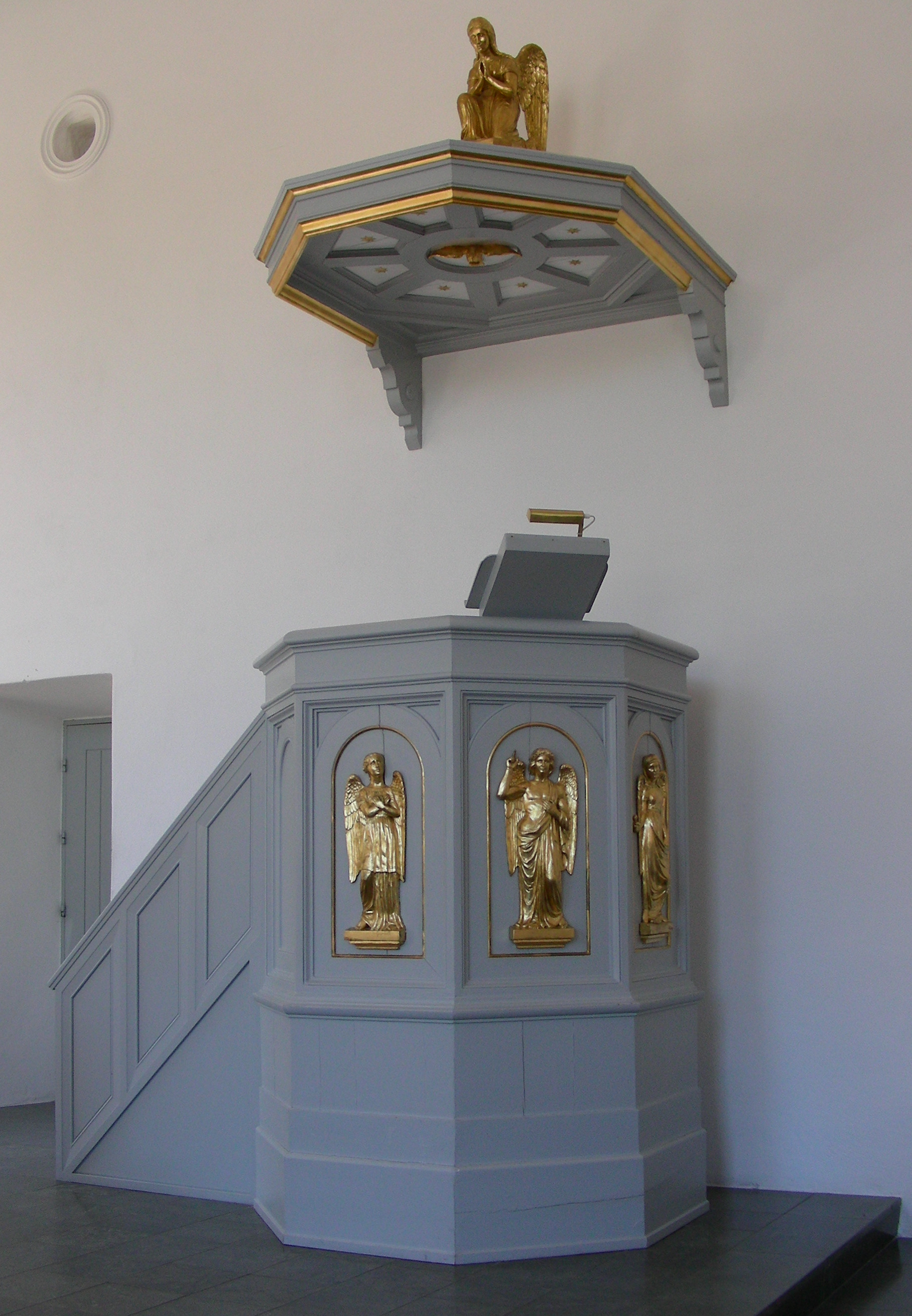
Pulpit

=== Pulpits ===
The church's first pulpit from 1704 is described as a single carpenter's work without any particular decoration. It had a sound sky "made of boards". It was painted pearl grey and red like the rest of the church's woodwork. It was located at about the same location as the present one, west of the altar.

The present pulpit dates from the great redevelopment in 1857 and was designed by Nebelong. It was originally in "oak colour", but whether it involves aging is not entirely clear. In 1958 it was painted pearl grey like the other woodwork, with gilded figures. It used to have a back wall with window-shaped squares around a center field with a cross, but it has been removed, presumably by the renovation in 1985-87. The sound sky now sits for itself on the wall above the pulpit.

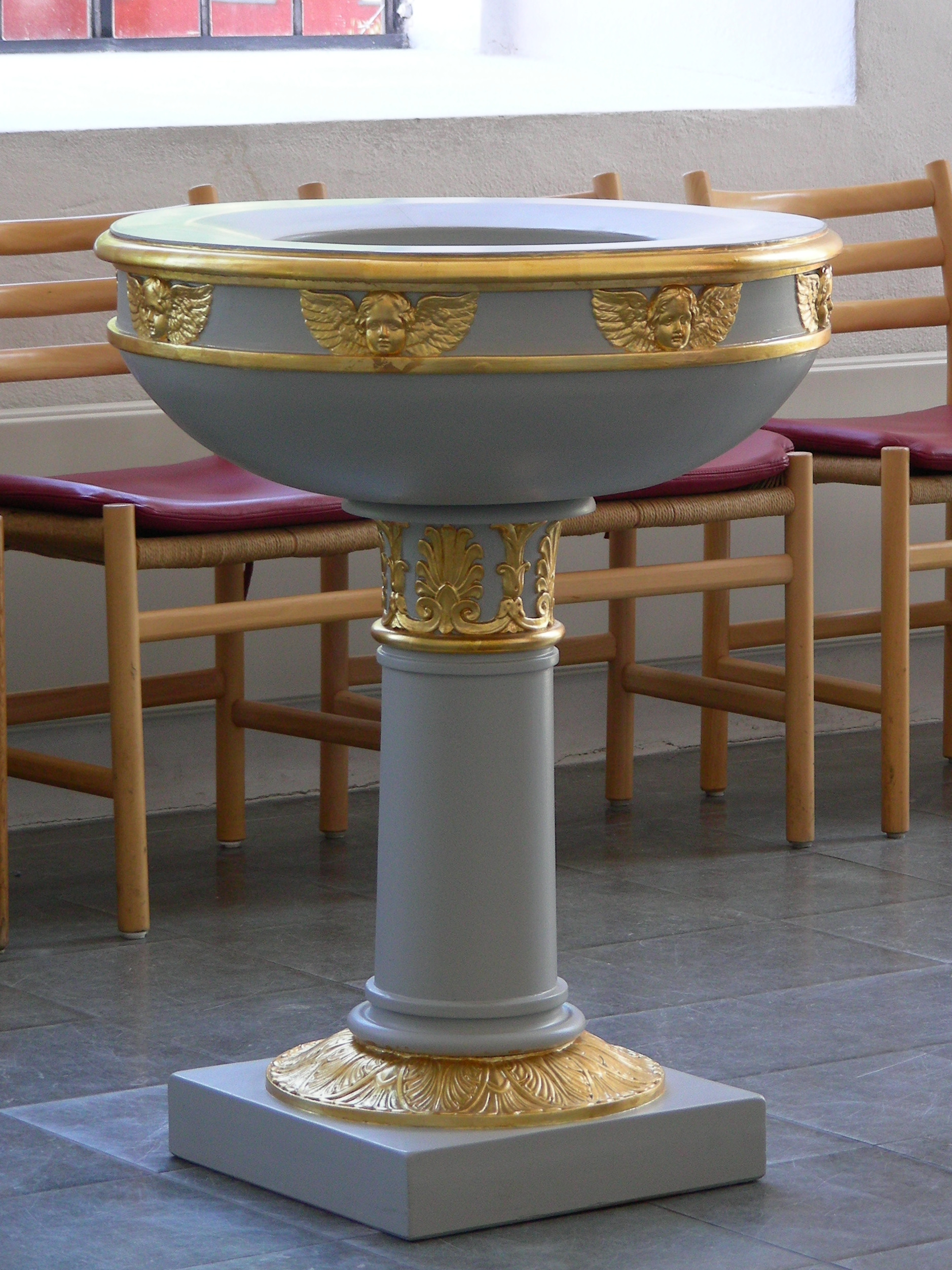
Baptismal font

=== Baptismal font ===
Until 1839 the church had no actual baptismal font, but a baptismal table was used. Originally, baptism was held in the northwest corner of the church in a font closure. Now it happens in the choir east of the altar.

The baptismal font dates from around 1820 and was not until Our Lady Church as a temporary font until 1839, when it was redundant and donated to the Citadel Church. It is made of wood and in a classicist style. Originally it was marbled in grey and white, now it stands in solid grey with gilt details.

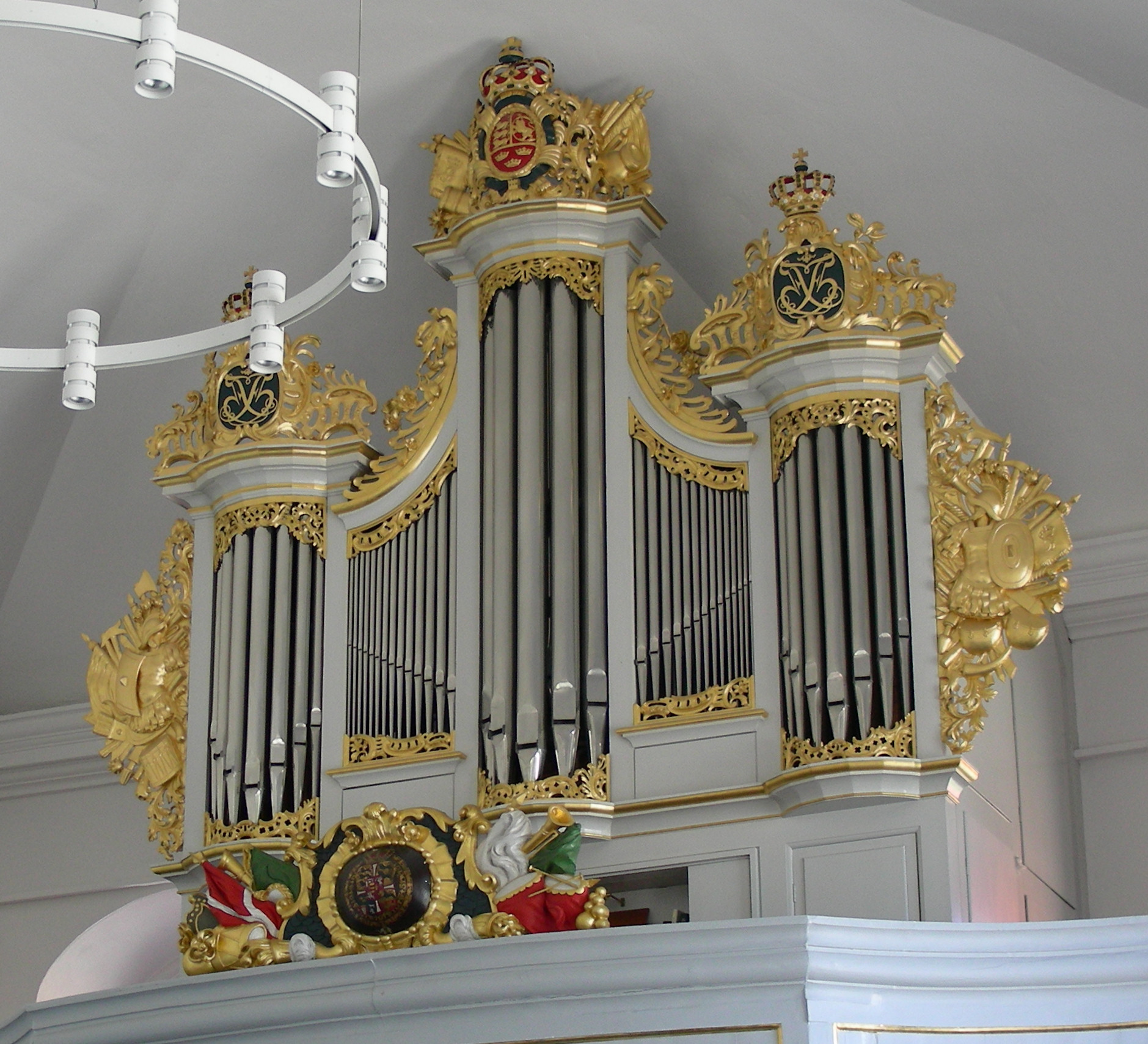
Organ facade

=== Organ ===
The church's first organ was provided by Johan Beverlin and was ready in the summer of 1705. It cost 60 dollars, so it has probably not been a great instrument. At the same time, the carpenter Jochum Jacobsen delivered a carving work in lime wood, which is believed to be the ornament that still sits on the organ pulpit.

In 1756, a new organ was acquired, of which little is known, besides being a rococo organ, and the price was 400 dollars. However, you know what the facade looked like, since it is the facade that is still seen on the organ. The instrument was used for over a hundred years, despite being almost unplayable in the end.

In 1859, Marcussen & Son delivered a new organ which was approved by the organists J.P.E. Hartmann and Niels W. Gade, but in 1922 it was replaced by one with 35 votes and three manuals, conducted by W. Sauer, Frankfurt an der Oder. The organ filled the entire room above the entrance and separated from the organ pulpit by a grating wall so that only the old organ facade could be seen.

In 1969, the church got its current organ from Poul-Gerhard Andersen's Organ Building. (The Marcus organ was sold to [Philip's Church].) It has 25 votes on two manuals and a pedal. The organ may be behind the old organ facade, so the back wall is no longer hidden.

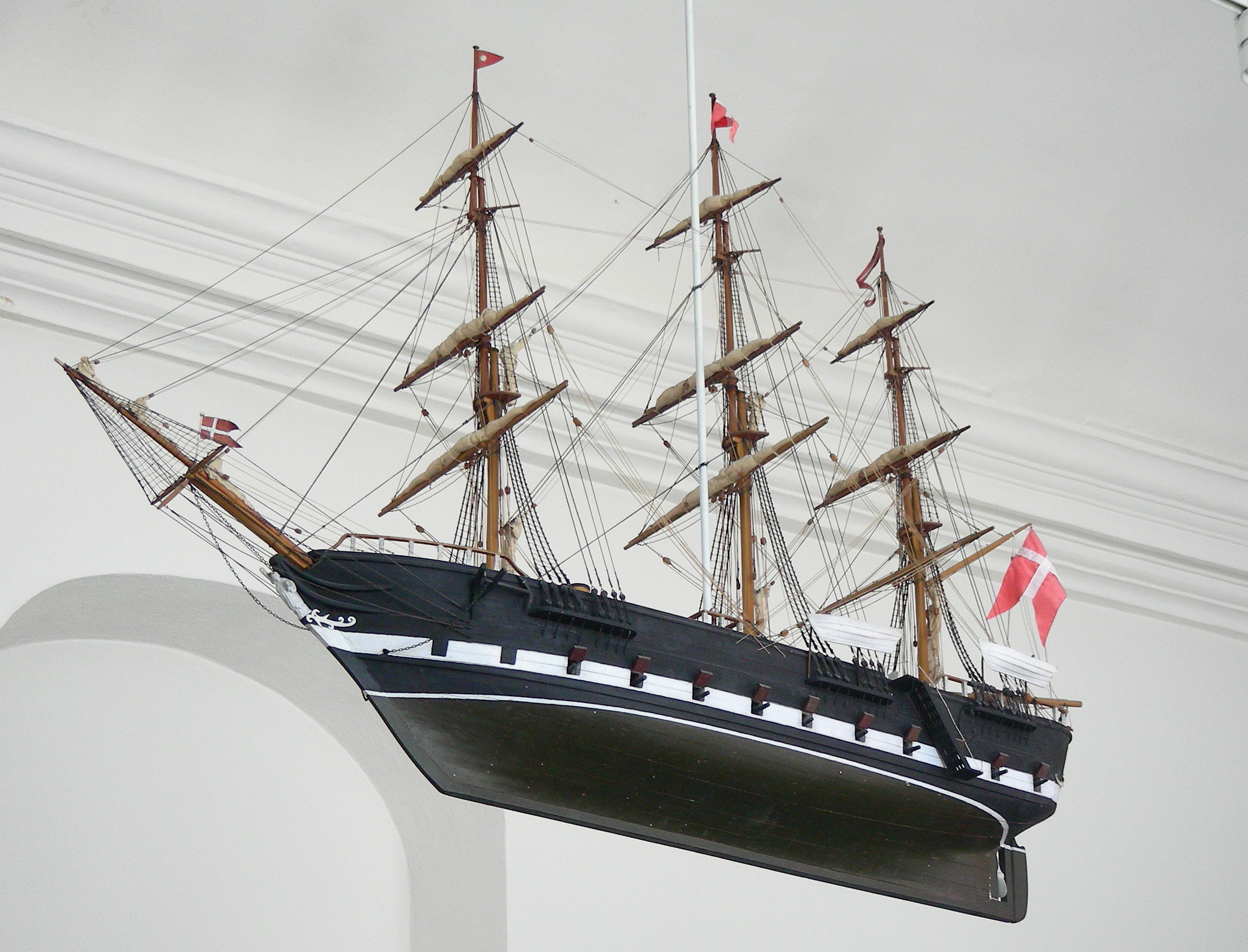
Ship

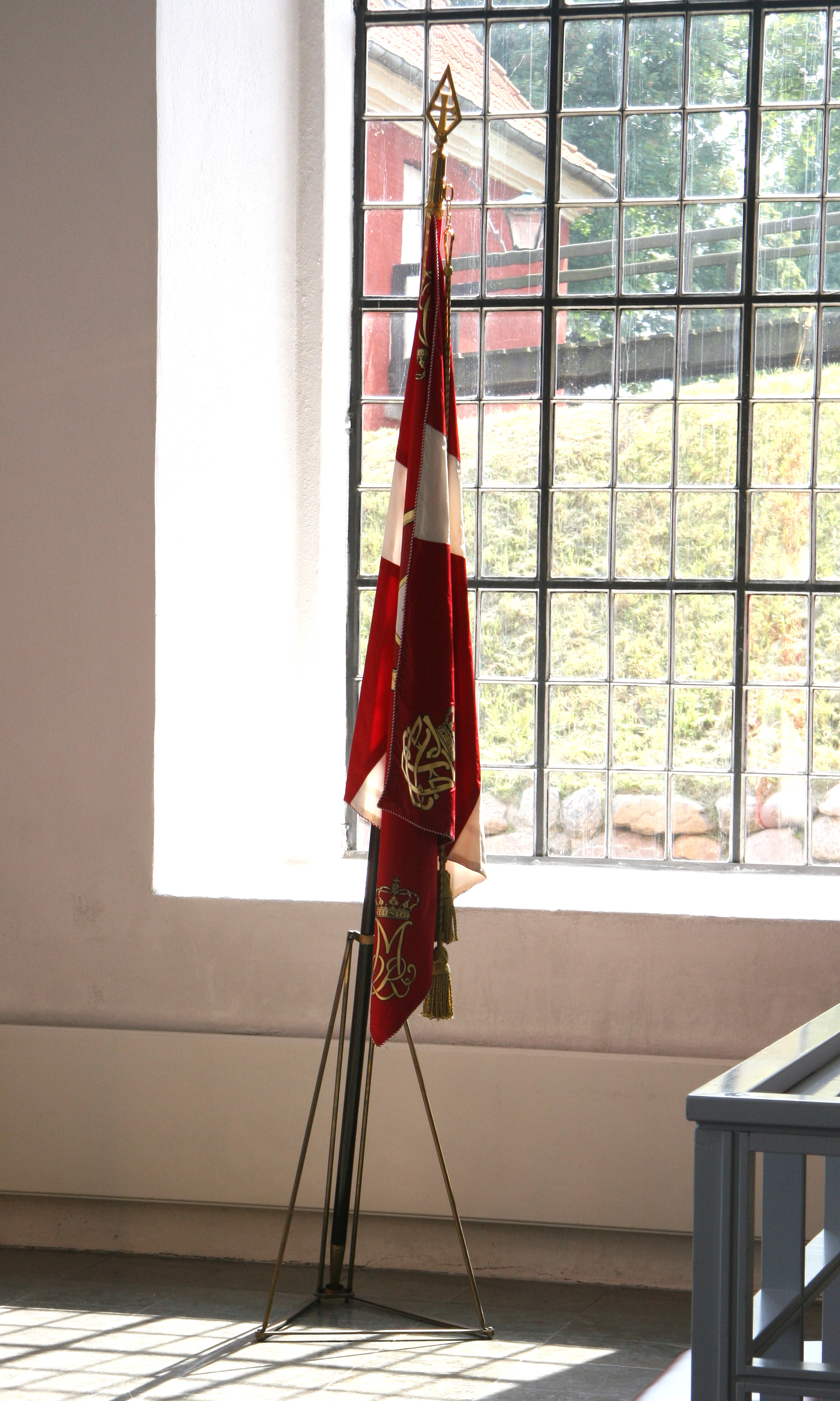
Flag

=== Church ship ===
The church ship, the Danish frigate Jylland, was a gift from the church's past pastor A.V. Storm (or possibly funded with a gift Storm received on behalf of the church. It is created by Gorm Clausen from Marstal in 1930.

=== Flag ===
Like Garrison's Church and Holmen's Church, Kastelskirken has a church flag. It was donated by the 1st Regiment, the Danish Life Regiment's Soldiers' Association in connection with the 325th anniversary of the Citadel on October 28, 1989. The tab is only promoted during the ecclesiastical acts. The cloth was renewed in 2004, paid for by the Chief of Defense and the commander of the Army Operational Command, as well as the 1st Regiment, the Danish Life Regiment's Soldiers' Association.

== Graveyard ==
There is no cemetery attached to the Citadel Church.
