= John Norcross =

John Nicolas Norcross (1688–1758, last name occasionally Northcross) was an English Jacobite pirate and privateer who sailed in service to Sweden.

== History ==
John Nicolas Norcross was born in Liverpool in 1688 and eventually served in the Royal Navy. As a Jacobite, he supported the deposed James II of England and his erstwhile successor James III (James Stuart), and was present at the Battle of Preston in 1715 when Jacobite forces were crushed. He fled England and was taken in by Swedish pirate lords Lars and Ingela Gathenhielm. They sent him to France in 1716 where he met fellow Jacobite exiles.

Norcross captained his own 4-gun privateer vessel for the Swedish, in which he captured the English trading vessel Alexander in October 1717. Before sailing back to Gothenburg he put into port in France where he was captured. His crew attempted to sail away without him but were overcome by their prisoners who escaped in the Alexander. The French sent Norcross back to England to stand trial but he was released (or escaped) with the intervention of the Abbé du Bois. General Dillon wrote of Norcross to the Duke of Mar in 1718:

“I am pretty well acquainted with Mr. Norcross. He has been here about 6 weeks ago, after making his escape from Dunkirk, where he was seized by orders. He appears to be an unsettled, scatter-brained fellow, and in my opinion, there can be no great reliance on proposals that come from him. He seems, however, very zealous for the King's service. When you have occasion for a pirate, he may be of use, excelling in that noble calling, and, I am told, being a good seaman.”

A priest wrote to the Duke of Mar at the same time describing him as "a mad fellow such as Northcross." Norcross himself wrote to the exiled “Old Pretender” James Stuart expressing his desire to serve the would-be King.

Sweden's King Charles XII died that December, and Norcross was arrested when it came to light that he had been seizing vessels outside the bounds of his privateering commission. He was sentenced to death in 1719 but fled; captured in Paris, he was released and pardoned by Sweden's King Frederick I. Norcross served Sweden for a time, acting as an agent in their attempts to establish a trading post on Madagascar by pardoning the pirates present at Ile Ste.-Marie. He obtained a pardon for the pirates from Peter the Great of Russia, though the agreement fell apart before Sweden or Russia could take advantage of the opportunity.

Norcross continued to advise the Swedish for several years. In 1727 he was captured and tried by Danish authorities. Convicted of a number of crimes, he was sentenced to life in prison. He served out his sentence in the Danish fortified citadel Kastellet in Copenhagen. During his imprisonment he conducted two failed escape attempts, which lead him to be shackled day and night and confined to a small wooden cage. While in this cage he was often shown off to the Copenhagen gentry, who would pay a fee to lo look at "the mad Englishman" He was released from solitary confinement in 1745 but was confined to castle grounds, where he died in 1758.

== See also ==
- Adam Baldridge, Abraham Samuel, and James Plaintain - three ex-pirates who established trading posts on or near Madagascar, with whose successors the Swedish had hoped to make deals.
