= Kastellet, Copenhagen =

Star fort in Copenhagen

Kastellet
- Citadellet Frederikshavn
- Part of Fortifications of Copenhagen
- Copenhagen in Denmark
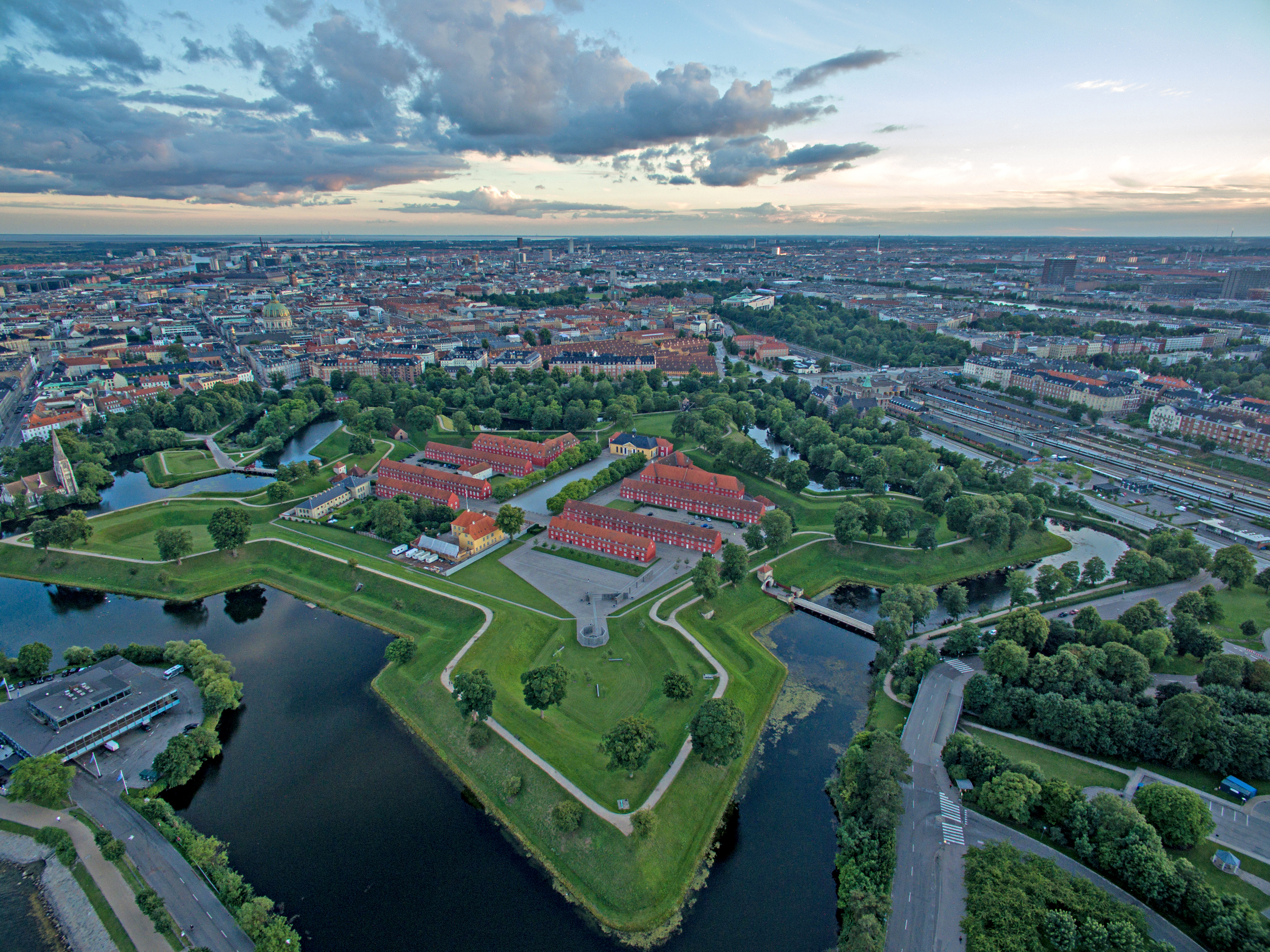
- Aerial of Kastellet

Site information
- Type: Citadel
- Open to the public: Yes
- Condition: Well preserved
- Website: Official website (in Danish)

Location
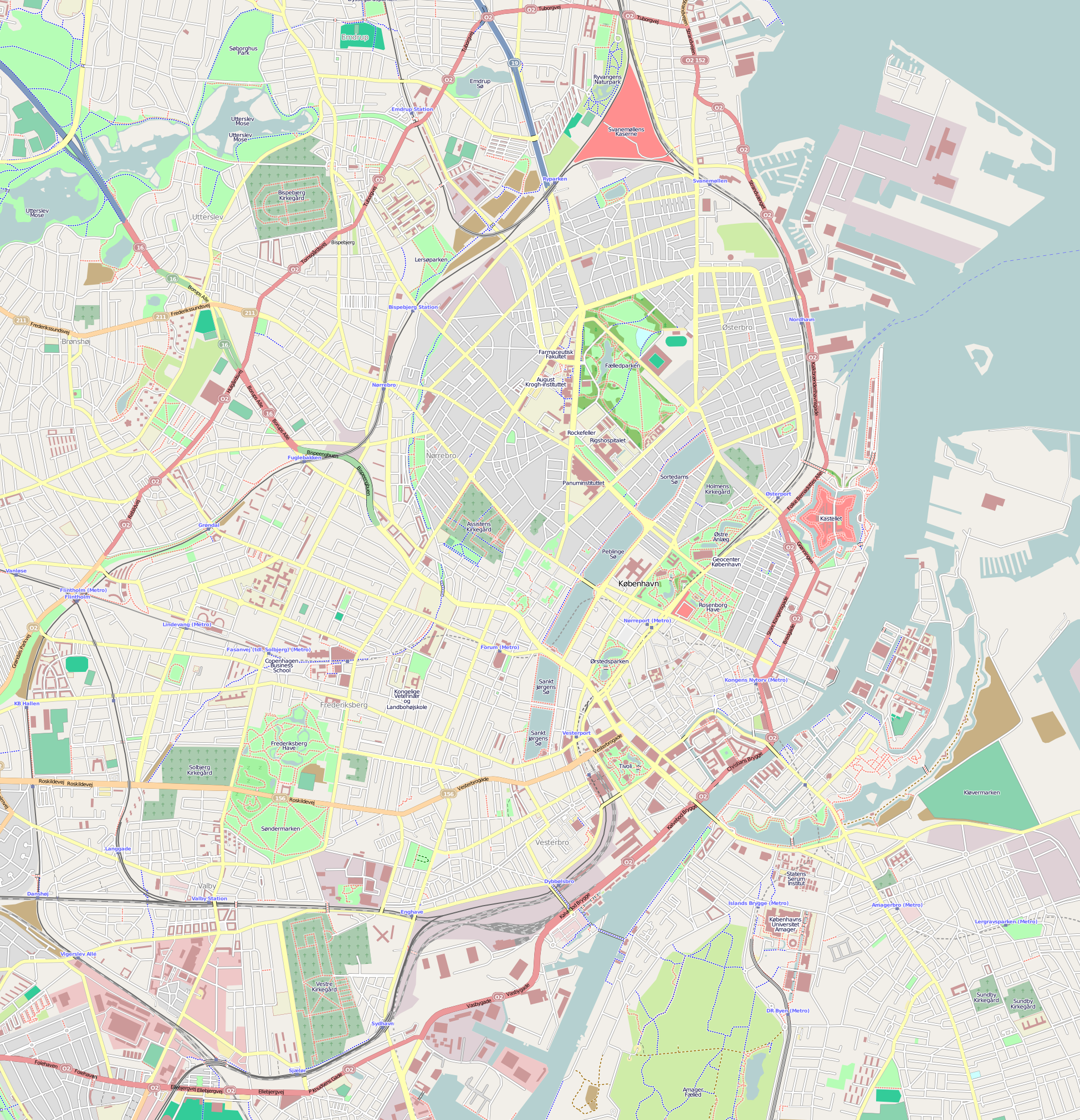
- Coordinates: 55°41′28″N 12°35′38″E

Site history
- Built: 30 October 1664
- In use: 1624–1830s
- Materials: earthworks

Garrison information
- Current commander: Major Allan Bo Petersen
- Past commanders: Prince Frederik of Hesse

Kastellet (Danish pronunciation: [kʰæˈsteˀlð̩]; transl. "The Citadel") is a citadel located in Copenhagen, Denmark. It is one of the best preserved fortresses in Northern Europe. It is constructed in the form of a pentagon with bastions at its corners. Kastellet was continuous with the ring of bastioned ramparts which used to encircle Copenhagen but of which only the ramparts of Christianshavn remain today.

A number of buildings are located within the grounds of Kastellet, including the Citadel Church as well as a windmill. The area houses various military activities but it also serves as a public park and a historic site.

== History ==
=== St. Anne's Redoubt ===
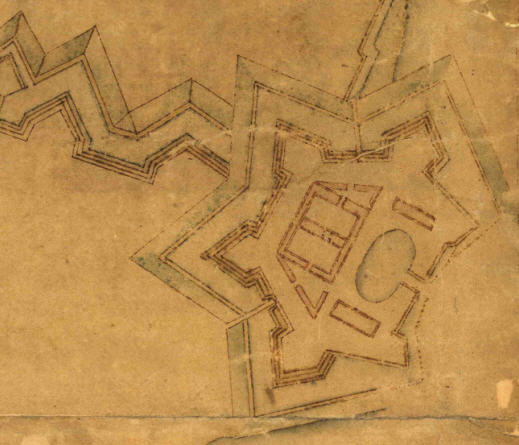
The Citadel in 1648, with an enclosed dock

King Christian IV of Denmark initiated Kastellet's construction in 1626 with the building of an advanced post, St. Anne's Redoubt (Danish: Sankt Annæ Skanse), on the coast north of the city. The redoubt guarded the entrance to the port, together with a blockhouse that was constructed north of Christianshavn, which had just been founded on the other side of the strait between Zealand and Amager. At that time the fortifications only reached as far north as present day Nørreport station, and then returned south east to meet the coast at Bremerholm, the Royal Shipyard. However, part of the king's plan was to expand the area of the fortified city by abandoning the old East Rampart and instead extend the rampart straight north to connect it to St. Anne's Redoubt. This plan was not completed until the mid-1640s, shortly after King Frederick III succeeded King Christian IV.

=== The new citadel ===
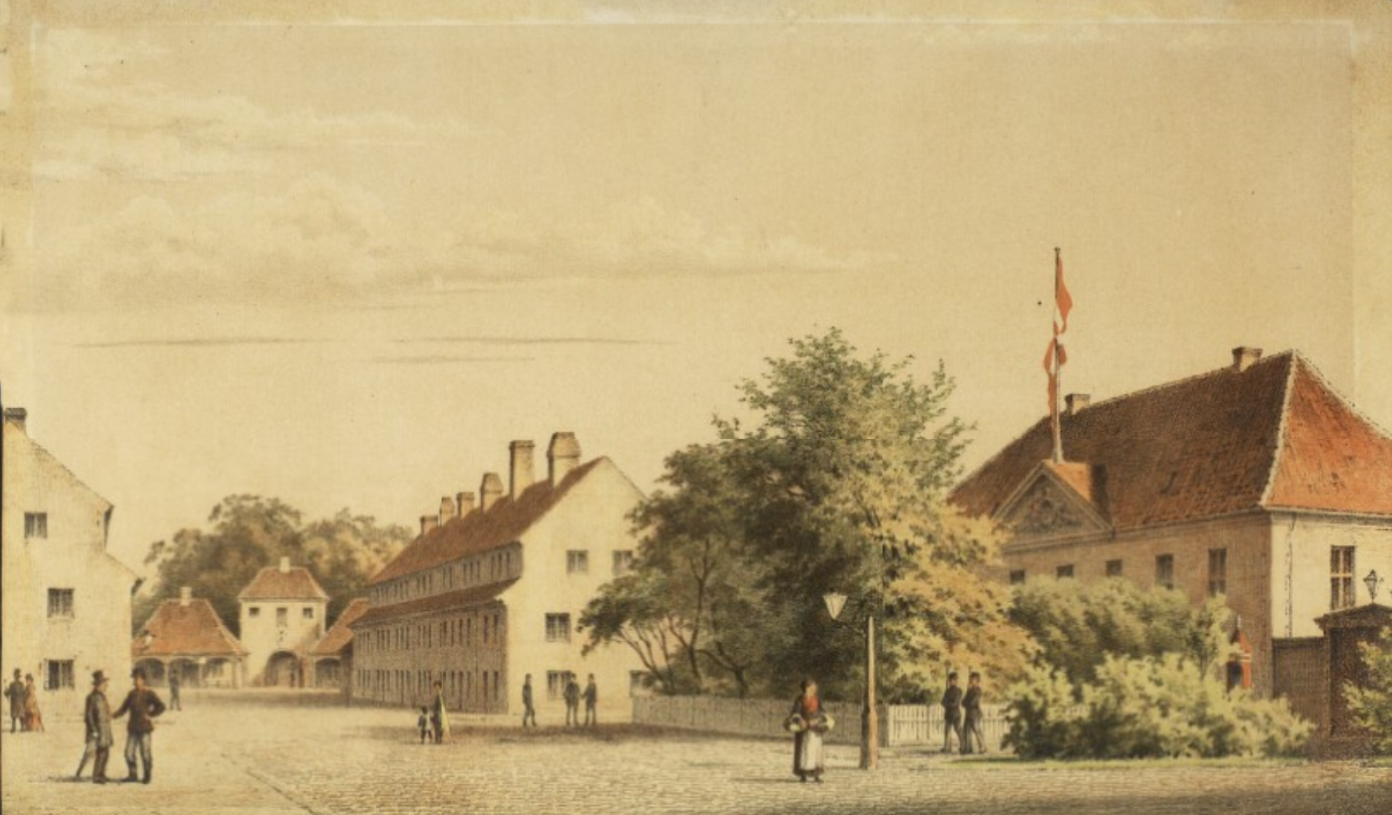
Kastellet in 1880 with Kommandantgården to the right

After the Swedish siege of Copenhagen (1658–1660) the Dutch engineer Henrik Rüse was called in to help rebuild and extend the construction. The fortification was named Citadellet Frederikshavn (transl. The Citadel Frederik's harbor), but it is better known as Kastellet ("the Citadel").

Kastellet was part of the defence of Copenhagen against the United Kingdom in the Battle of Copenhagen (1807).

Christen Købke (1810–1848), Danish painter associated with the Golden Age of Danish Painting, grew up in Kastellet and made many paintings of the area.

During the German invasion of Denmark on 9 April 1940, German troops landing at the nearby harbor captured The Citadel without resistance.

Kastellet was renovated 1989–1999 with funds from the A.P. Møller and Wife Chastine McKinney Møllers General Fund.

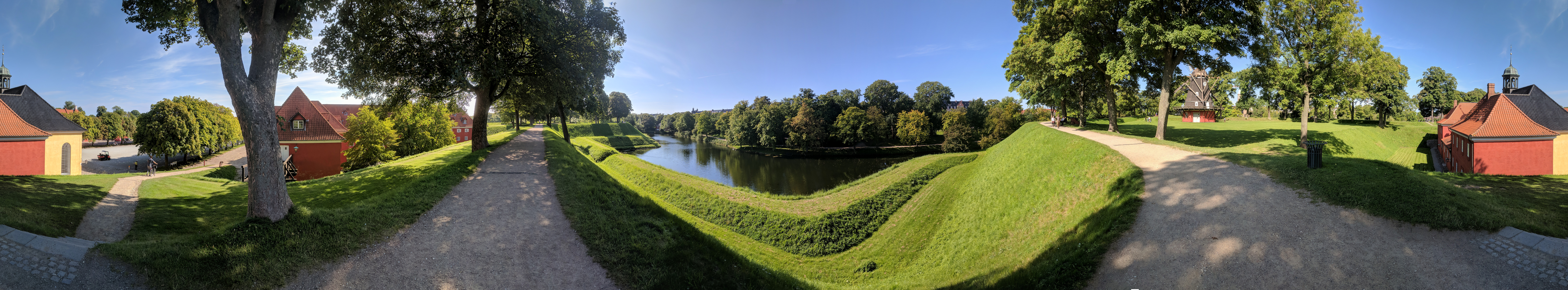
A 360-degree pano from the top of a rampart at The Citadel (Kastellet) in Copenhagen, Denmark, showing various features including the windmill.

== Layout ==
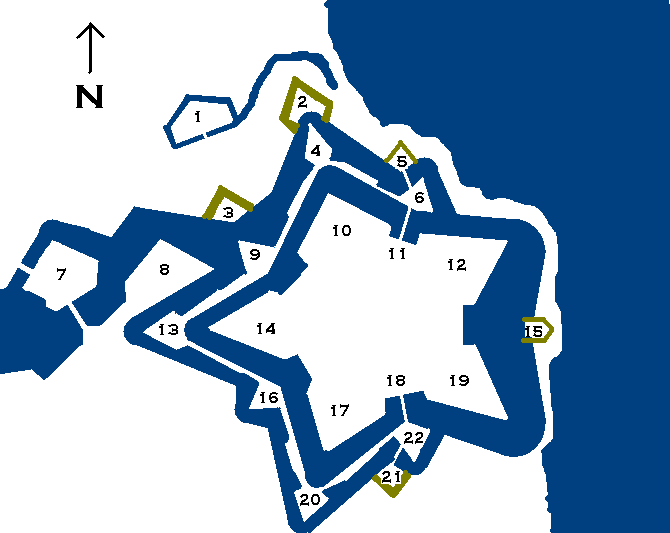
The Citadel around 1750: 1) Spitsbergen's Lunette 2) Faroe Reduit 3) Hetland's Reduit 4) Lolland's Contregarde 5) Norway's Reduit 6) Norway's Ravelin 7) Østerport's Ravelin 8) Greenland's Bastion 9) Bornholm's Ravelin 10) Prince's Bastion 11) Norway's Gate 12) Princess' Bastion 13) Møen's Contregarde 14) King's Bastion 15) Pinneberg's Reduit 16) Funen's Ravelin 17) Queen's Bastion 18) King's Gate (or Zealand's Gate) 19) Count's Bastion 20) Falster's Contregarde 21) Zealand's Reduit 22) Zealand's Ravelin.

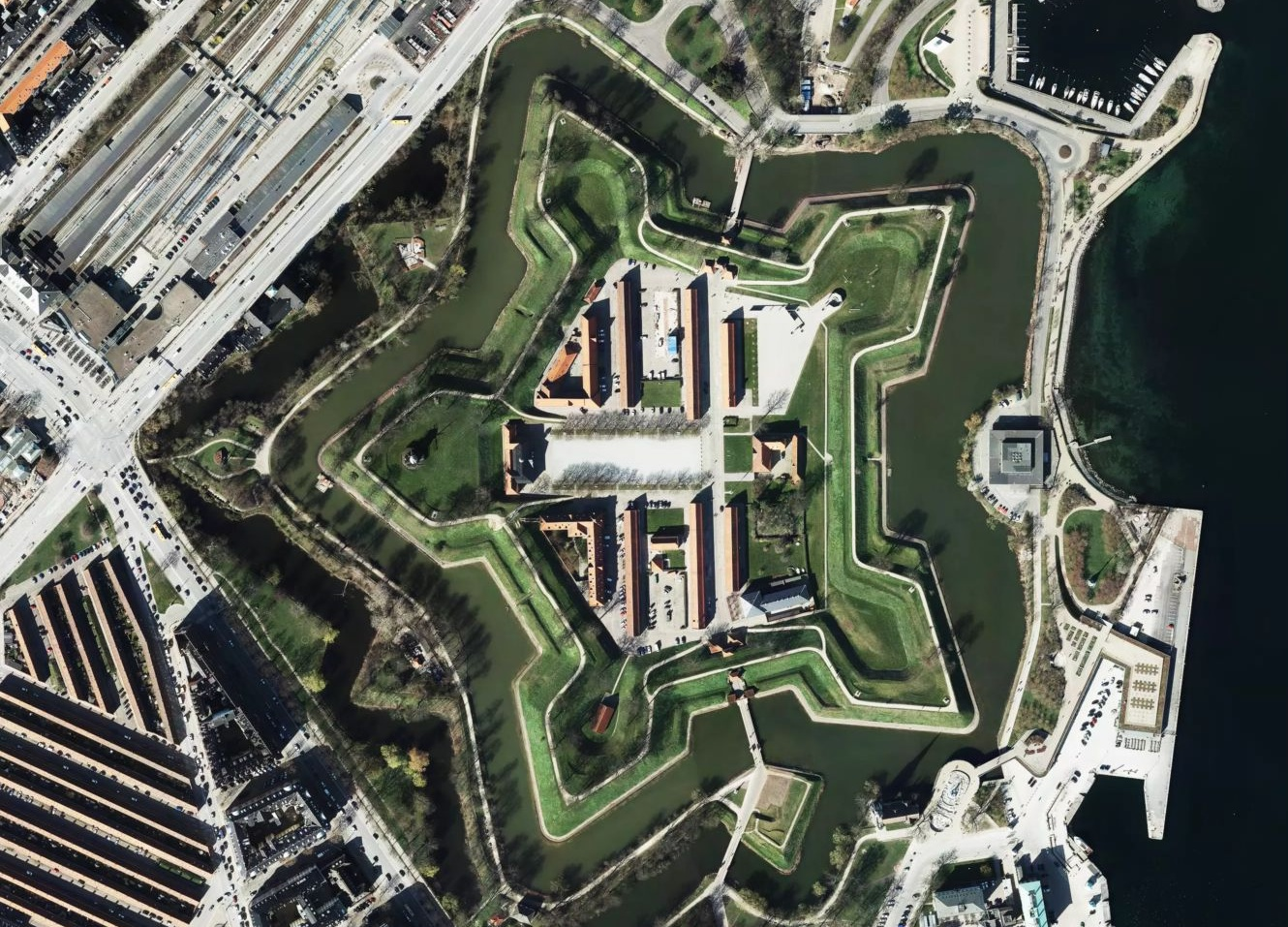
Aerial view of Kastellet, 2014.

=== Gates ===
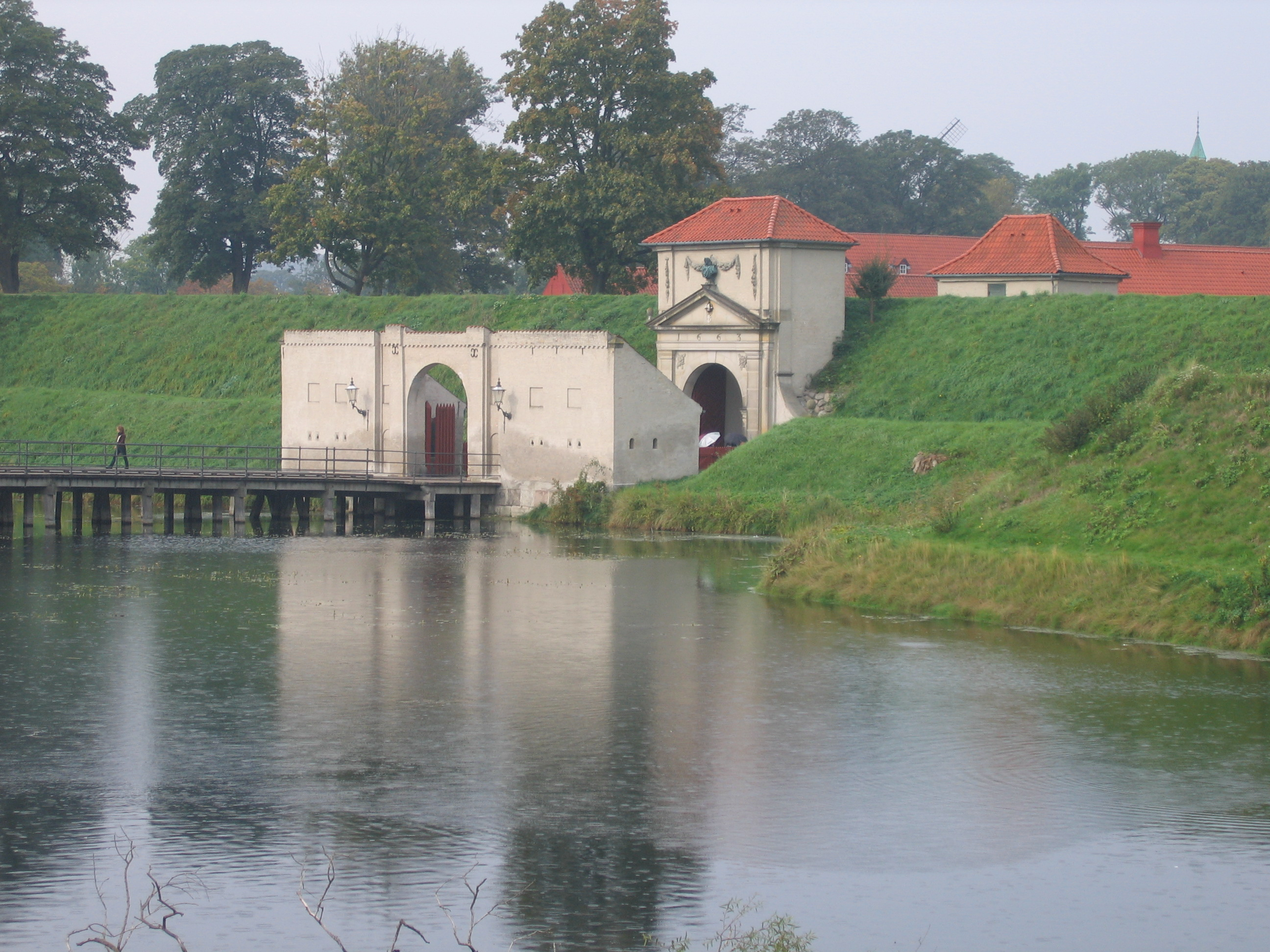
Outside view of the King's Gate

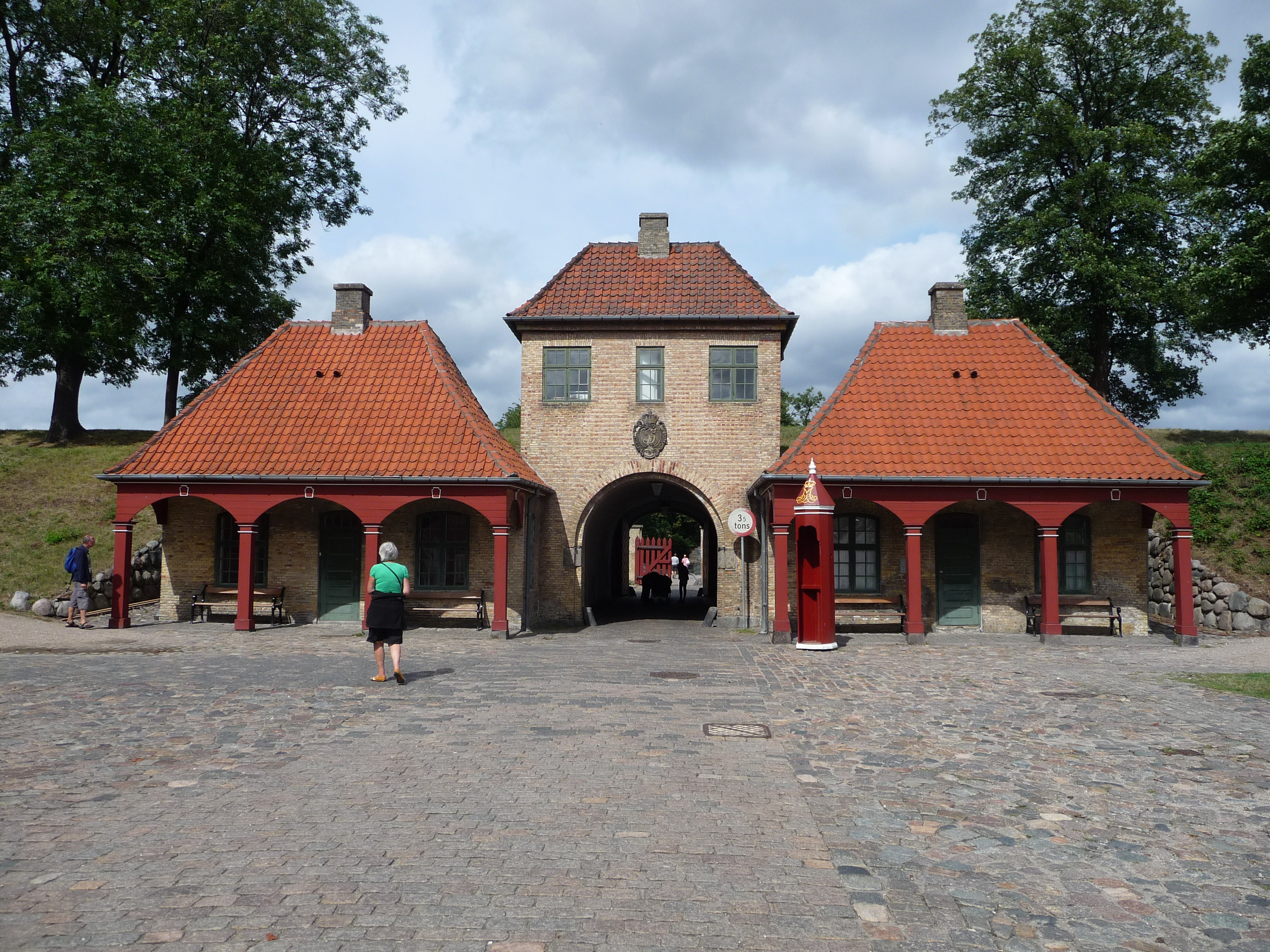
The interior side of the North Gate

The Citadel has two gates, King's Gate on the south side, facing the city, and Norway Gate on the north side of the edifice, which both date from 1663 as part of Ruise's original citadel. They are built in the Dutch Baroque style, and are on their interior side flanked by guardhouses. The King's Gate is decorated with garlands and pilasters, and a bust of King Frederik III. The clock and two bells on the interior facade of the gate come from the Central Guard House at Kongens Nytorv and were installed in 1874 when the central guard moved to the Citadel. In front of the gate stand two so-called caponiers from where it was possible to keep assaulting troops under fire. The Norway Gate used to face open countryside outside the city, and has therefore been built to a more simple design. The caponiers of this gate were demolished in the late 19th century.

=== Bastions ===
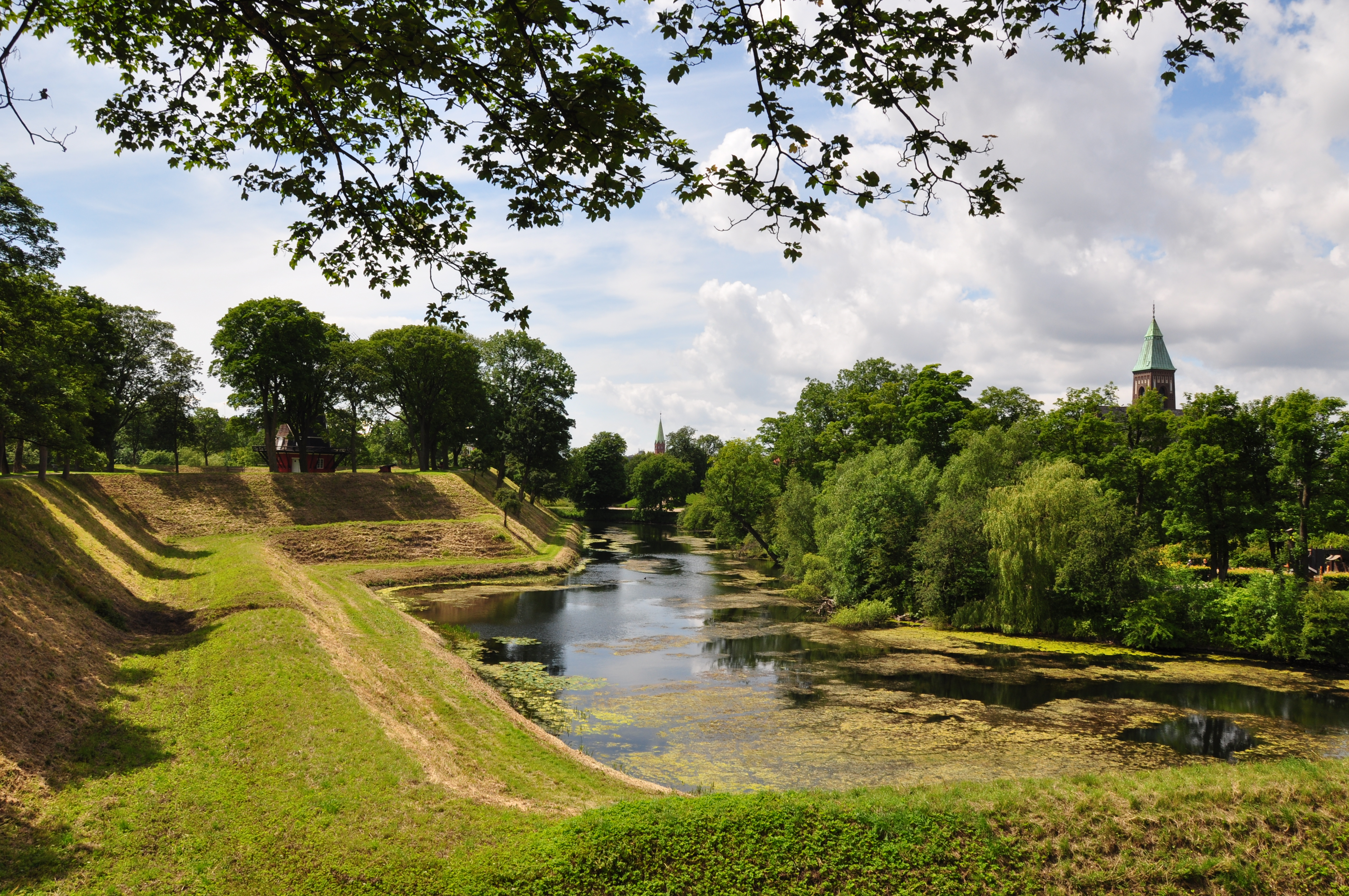
The former earthworks now serving as a greenspace

The five bastions are named as follows: The King's Bastion (Danish: Kongens Bastion), The Queen's Bastion (Danish: Dronningens Bastion), The Count's Bastion (Danish: Grevens Bastion), the Princess's Bastion (Danish: Prinsessens Bastion) and the Prince's Bastion (Danish: Prinsens Bastion).

=== Moat and the Blacksmith's Line Outworks ===
The Blacksmith's Line (Danish: Smedelinien) is a system of outworks, separating the inner and the outer moat, located to the south and southwest towards the city. It consisted of four ravelins and three counter guard interconnected by long, low earthworks. On Fyn's Ravelin, one of the eponymous forges has been preserved and is now used by the park authorities. Another forge was built on Falster's Counter Guard in 1709. Rebuilt in 1888, it now serves as residence of military employees. When the Free Port of Copenhagen was constructed, the northern portion of the Blacksmith's Line was dug away, but the remaining part was put at the disposal of the City of Copenhagen in 1918 and now serves as parkland.

== Buildings ==
=== Commander's House ===
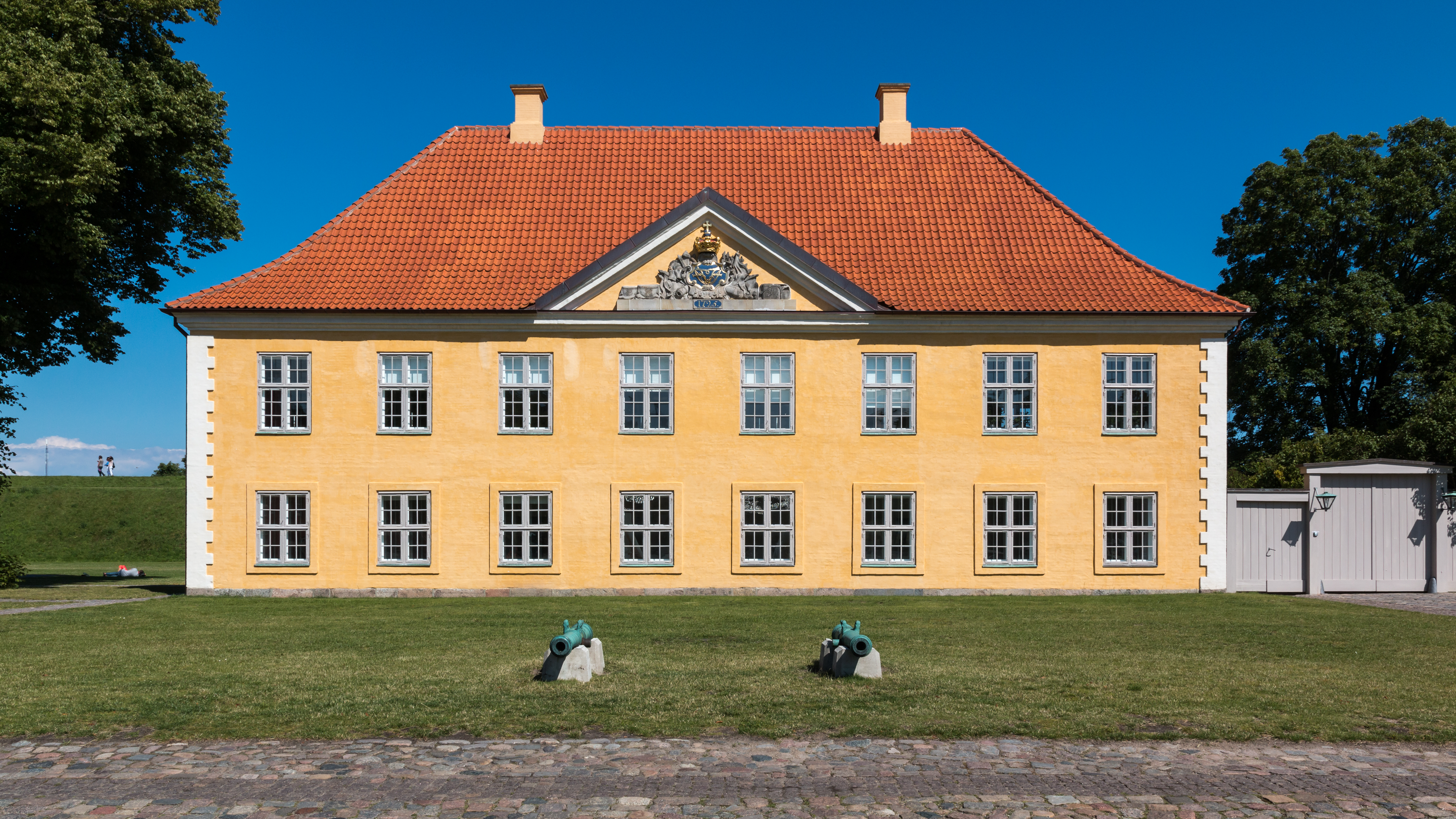
The Commander's House

The Commander's House (Danish: Kommandantboligen) served as the residence of the commander of Kastellet. It was built in 1725 in the Baroque style by architect and master builder Elias Häuser who also designed the first Christiansborg Palace which burned in 1794. Built in yellow-dressed masonry with white detailing, it consists of two floors under a red tile roof. The triangular pediment is decorated with a relief and Christian VII's monogram under topped by a crown. It served as the official residence of the Chief of Defence until 2008.

=== The Rows ===
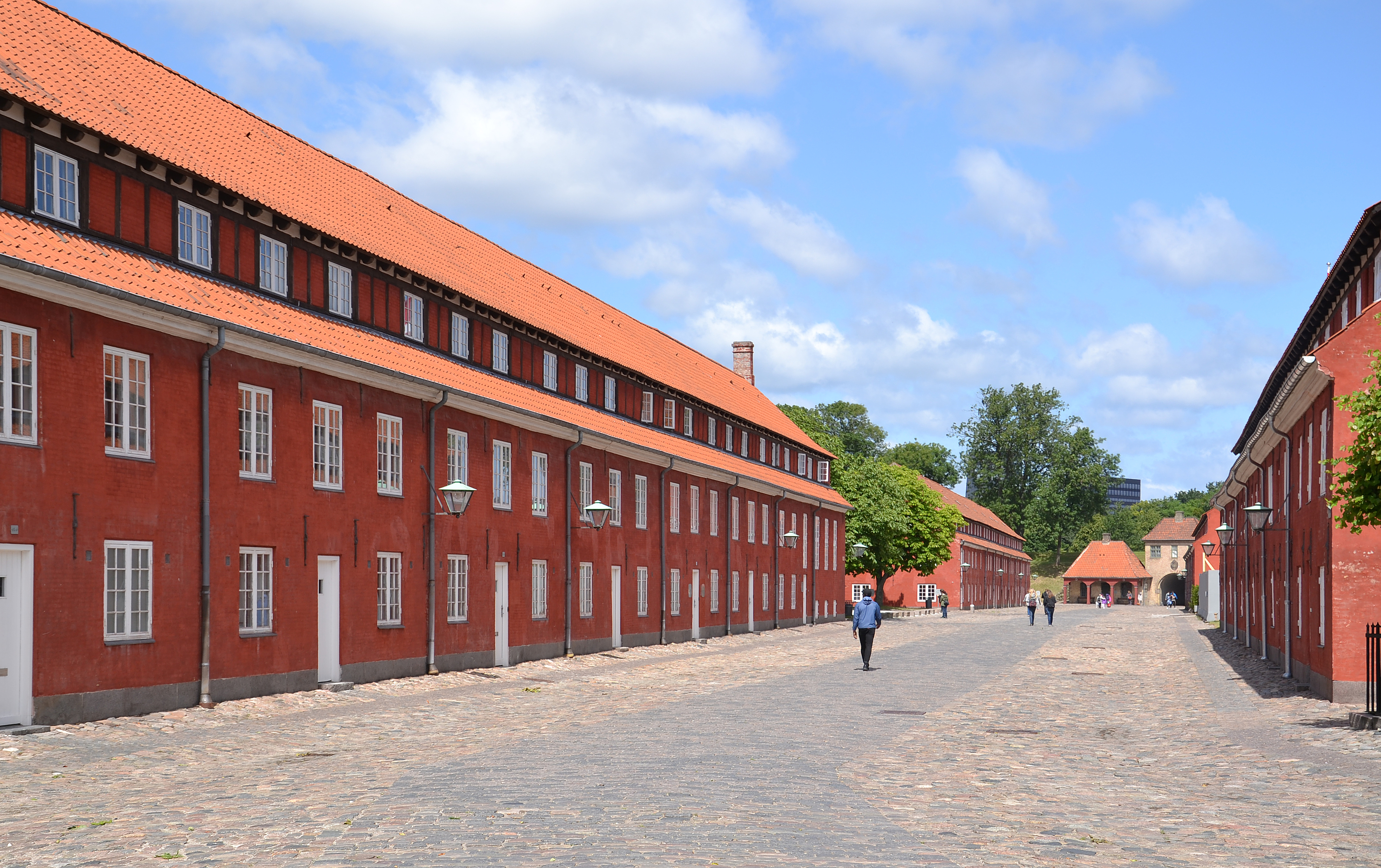
The Rows

The Rows (Danish: Stokkene) are six two-storey terraces which were originally built by Henrik Ruise as barracks for the soldiers based at the Citadel. The dorms measured four by four metres and contained two triple beds, a small table and two benches. Over time they became known under individual names: General Stock where the commanders resided until the Commander's House was built, Artillery Stock for the artillerists, and Star Stock, Elephant Stock, Swan Stock and Fortuna Stock. The Mansard roofs are not part of the original design but date from 1768 when the rows were altered. The original roof profile is today only seen at the end of Artillery Row as seen from the Prince's Bastion.

=== Southern and Northern Storehouse ===
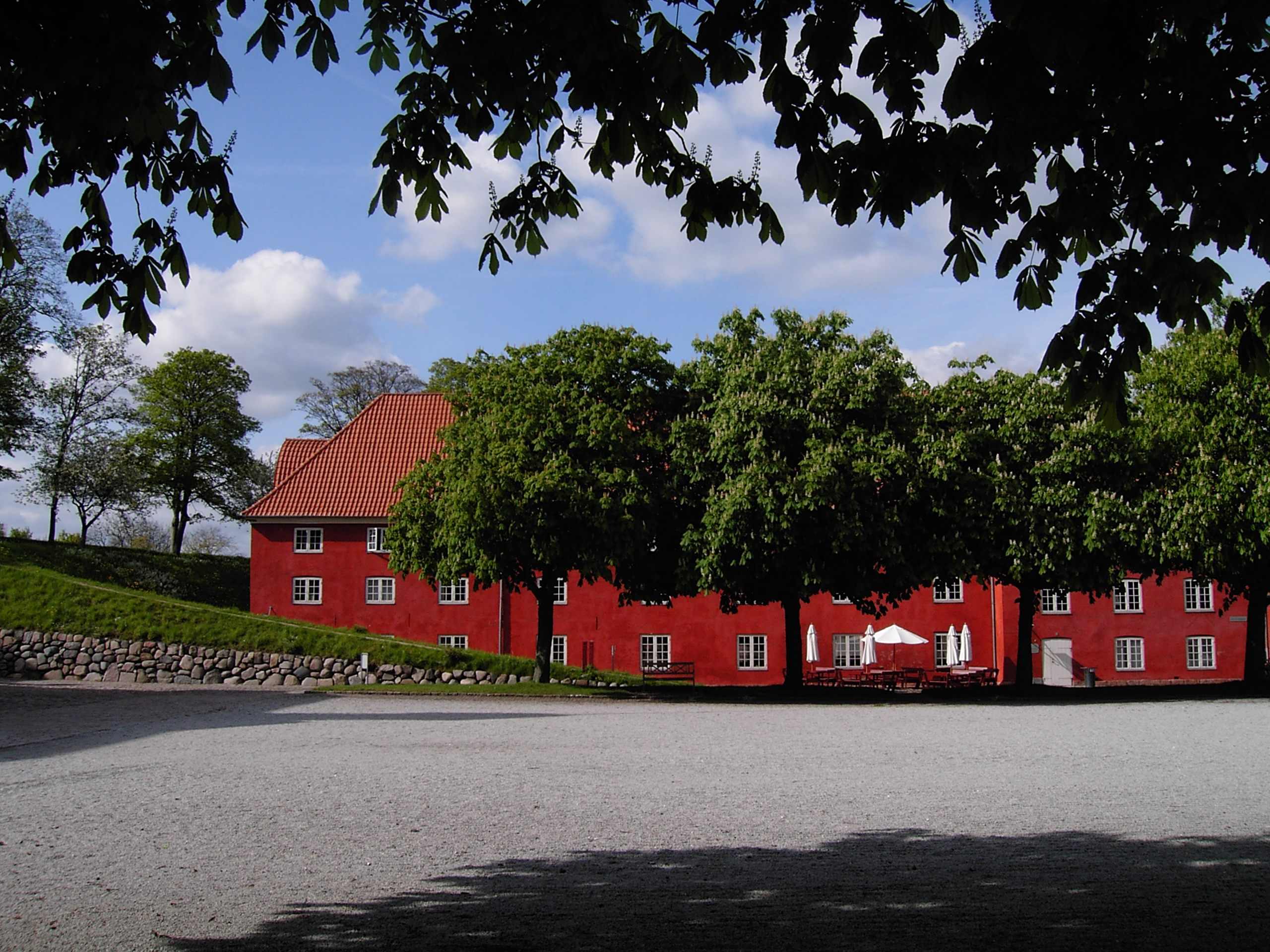
One of the storehouses

The two storehouses also date from the foundation of the Citadel. They were to store everything need in the event of a siege, and could when full feed the 1,800 men of the garrison, other personnel, and their families for four years. The Southern Storehouse (Danish: Søndre Magasin) served as an arsenal while the Northern Storehouse (Danish: Nordre Magasin) contained a granary.

=== Powder house ===
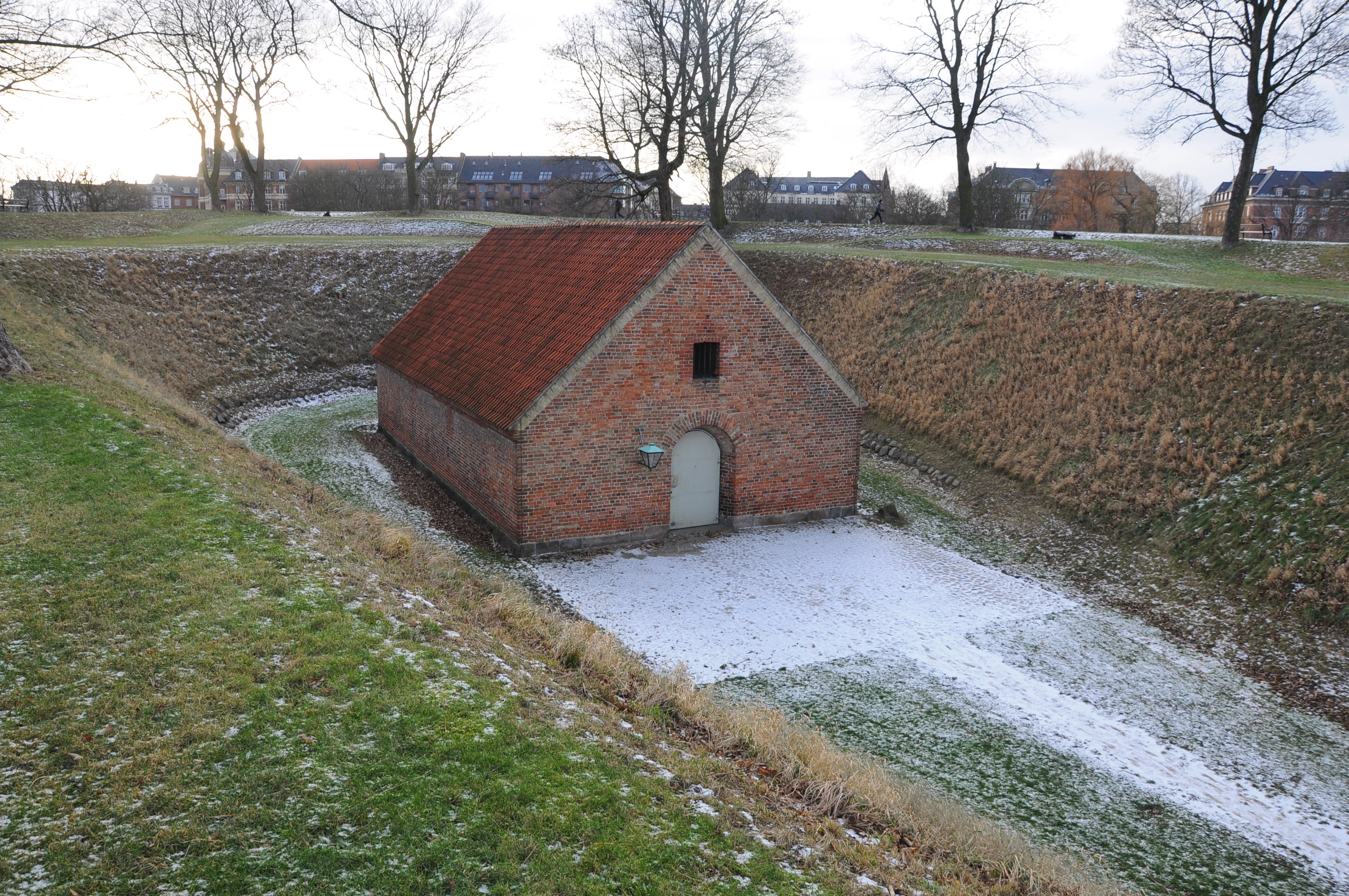
The powder house at the Queen's Bastion

The Powder House at the Queen's Bastion, which was used for the storage of black powder, is the only surviving of originally two identical powder houses which were built by Domenico Pelli in 1712. The other one was located at the Count's Bastion. It was designed with massive walls and a slightly vaulted ceiling to ensure that a possible explosion would move upward and thereby cause a minimum of damages to the surroundings. When in 1779 a powder house at the East Rampart exploded, causing damages in the Nyboder area and all the way to Bredgade, it was decided that it was too dangerous to store explosives at the Ramparts, and the powder houses at the Citadel instead came into use as a jailhouse.

=== Church ===
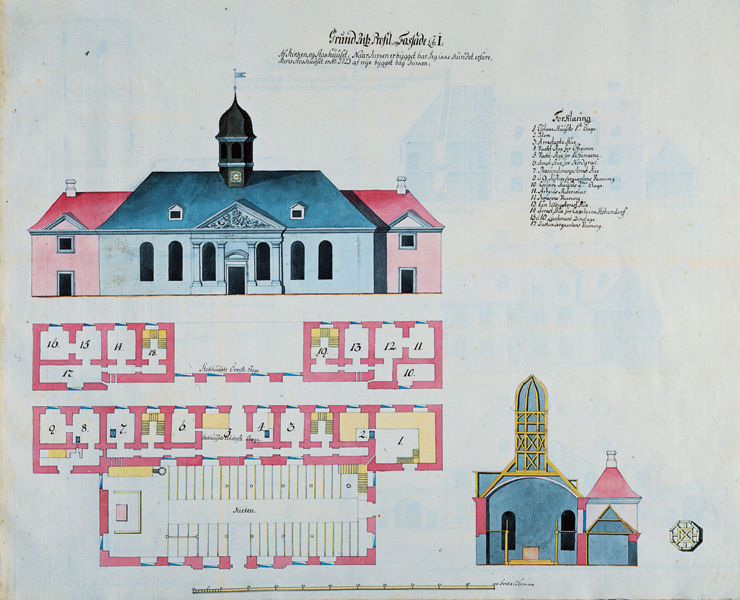
The Kastelskirken church and adjacent prison

The Kastelskirken ("Citadel Church") was built in 1703–4 in heavy Baroque style during the reign of King Frederik IV. It includes sound holes to the prison to enable prisoners to follow services.

=== Prison ===
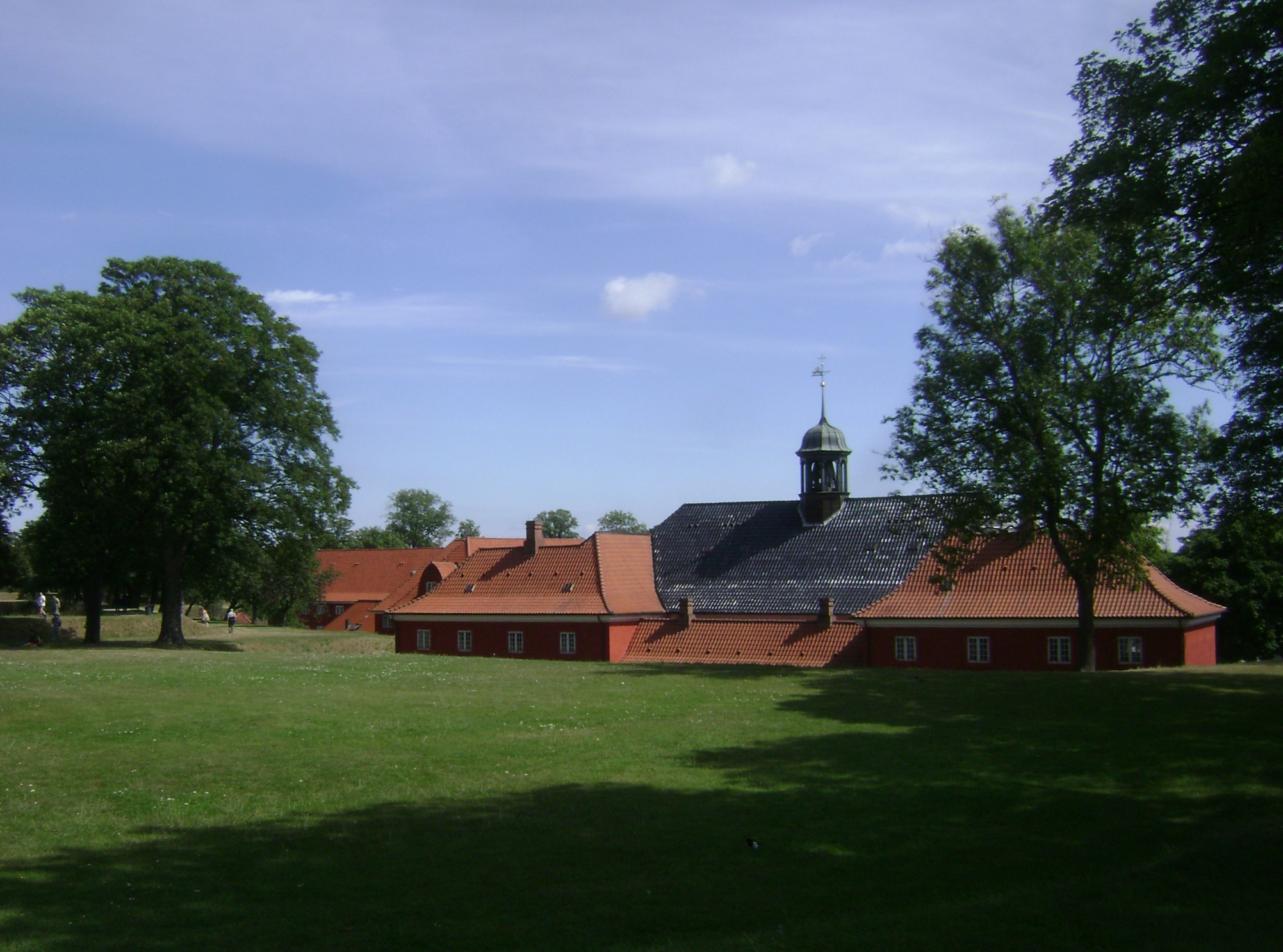
The prison complex on the rear side of the church

A prison complex was built on the rear side of the church in 1725. Eye holes in the wall between the church and the prison cells made it possible for the prisoners to follow the church services.

Struensee awaited his execution in Kastellet's prison. The English explorer and pirate John Norcross was the person to be imprisoned at Kastellet for the most extensive period. He spent 32 years in the prison at Kastellet, 16 of the years in a wooden cage.

=== Windmill ===
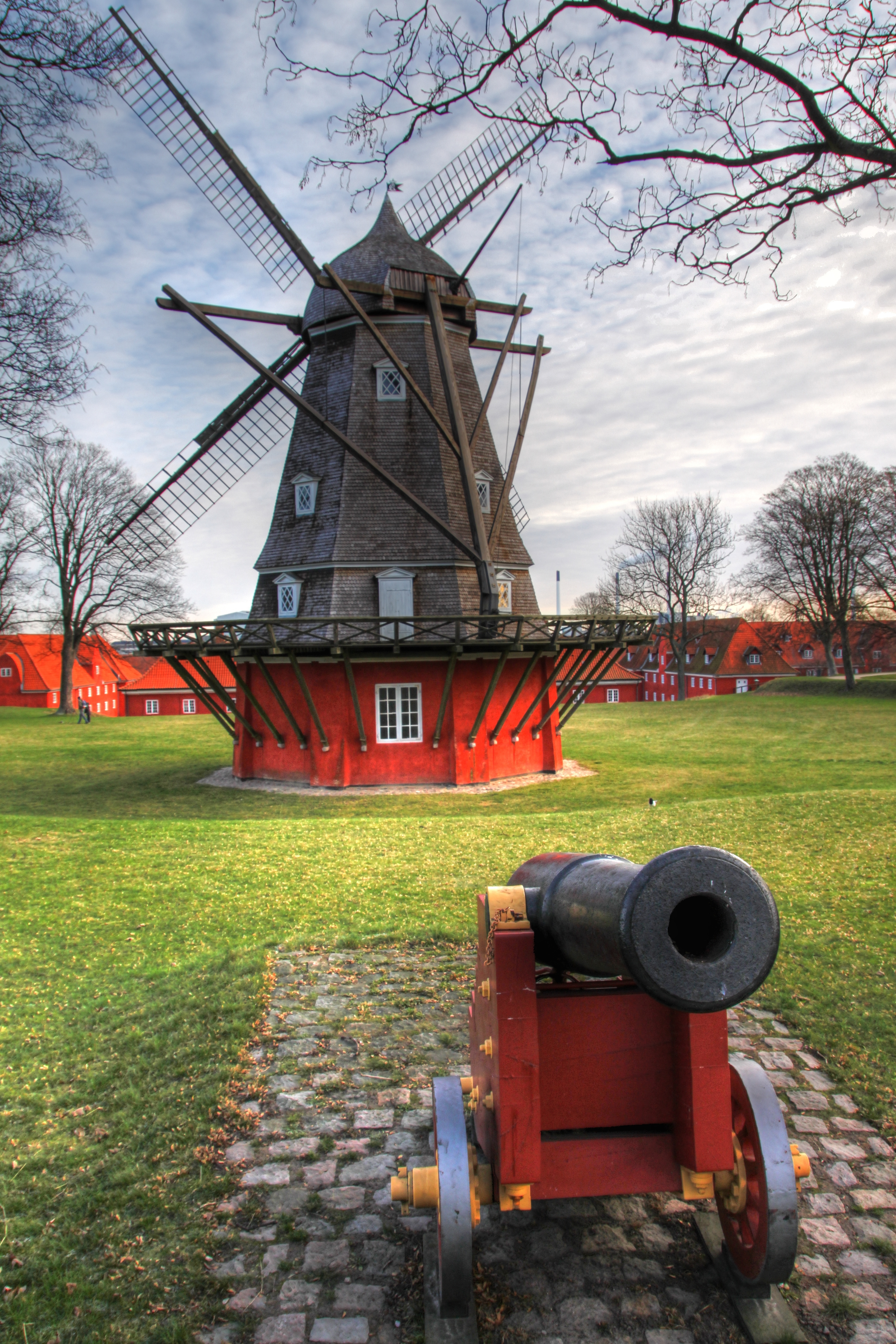
The windmill at Kastellet

On the King's Bastion, in the southwestern corner of Kastellet, stands a windmill. Built in 1847, it replaced another mill from 1718 which was destroyed by a storm the year before. The original mill was a post mill while the current mill is of the Dutch type.

Since a fortified city needed secure supplies, including supplies of flour and rolled groats, in the event of siege, numerous windmills were constructed on the bastions. In 1800, a total of 16 windmills were found on the ramparts of Copenhagen. The mill at Kastellet is the last which is still working, while another one, Lille Mølle at the Christianshavn Rampart, was transformed into a private home in 1915 and now survives as a historic house museum.

Russian Empress Consort Maria Feodorovna, daughter of Christian IX of Denmark, got her rye flour from the mill at Kastellet. The Army's Bread Factory would send it to the Imperial Court in Saint Petersburg where she was served øllebrød every morning in the Anichkov Palace.

=== Central Guard House ===
Located just inside the King's Gate, the Central Guard House was built from 1873 to 1874 with an attached jailhouse. The architect is unknown. It replaced the Central Guard house at Kongens Nytorv where the Central Guard had been stationed since 1724.

== Kastellet today ==
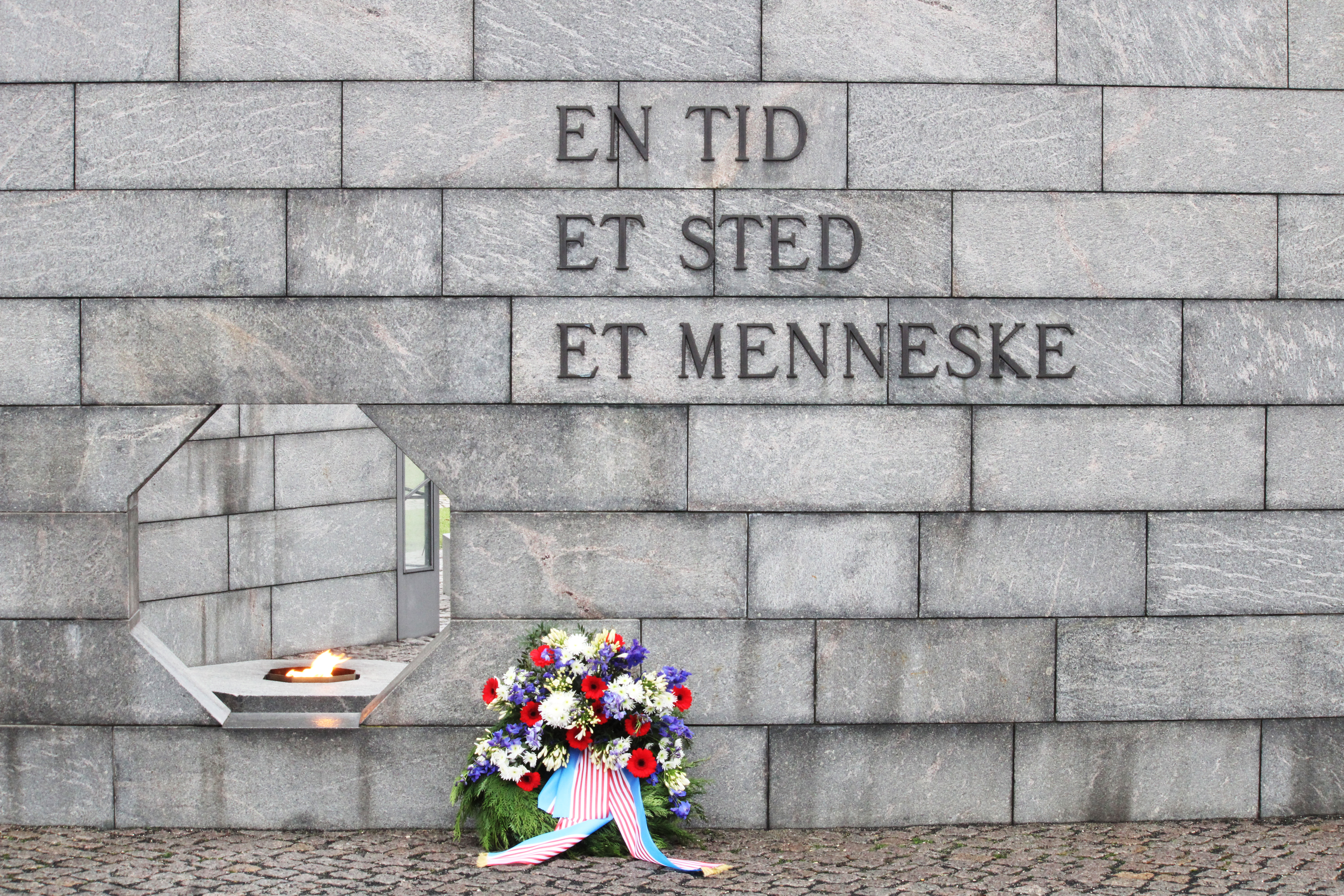
Memorial for Danish fallen after 1948

=== Military use ===
The Citadel is still an active military area that belongs to the Ministry of Defence. Military activity in the area includes use by the Home Guard, Defence Intelligence Service, the Judge Advocate Corps, and the Royal Garrison Library.

=== Visitation and museums ===
In spite of the continuous military presence in the area, the Citadel is today a peaceful, protected area, serving as a public park as well as a cultural-historical monument. It is located close to Langelinie, The Little Mermaid, the Gefion Fountain. It is a popular place to go for a walk on a sunny day, and is very popular with children on account of the many animals and birds in the grounds, including Black-headed gull, Pomeranian duck, European herring gull, Grey heron and Mute swan. The site includes two small museums with limited opening hours. The Garrison's Historical Collections are on display in one of the guard buildings inside the North Gate. The other is the Livjæger Museum.

== Special events and concerts ==
There is a changing of the guard ceremony at the Central Guard House every day at 12.00. Military concerts take place at the drill grounds on summer afternoons at 14.00. The Citadel Church frequently arranges concerts as well.

The Citadel's birthday on 28 October is marked with an annual concert and the wings of the windmill. It is a tradition to promenade on the ramparts on Store Bededag, a Danish holiday, which is also celebrated with music.

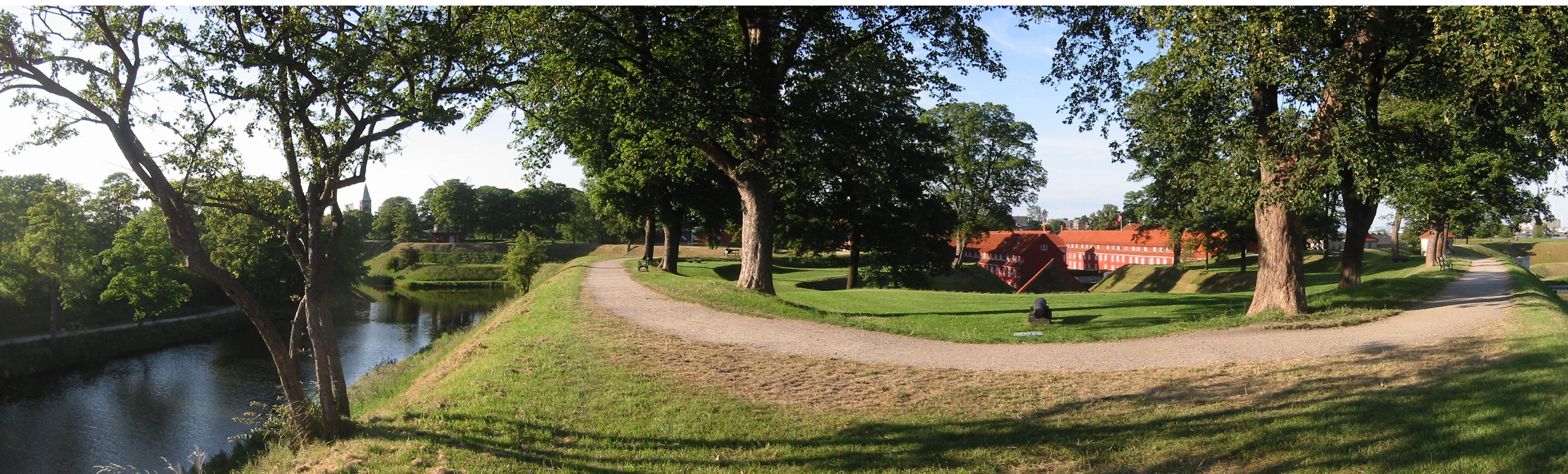
Kastellet panorama
