= Henrik Rysensteen =

Dutch officer and fortification engineer

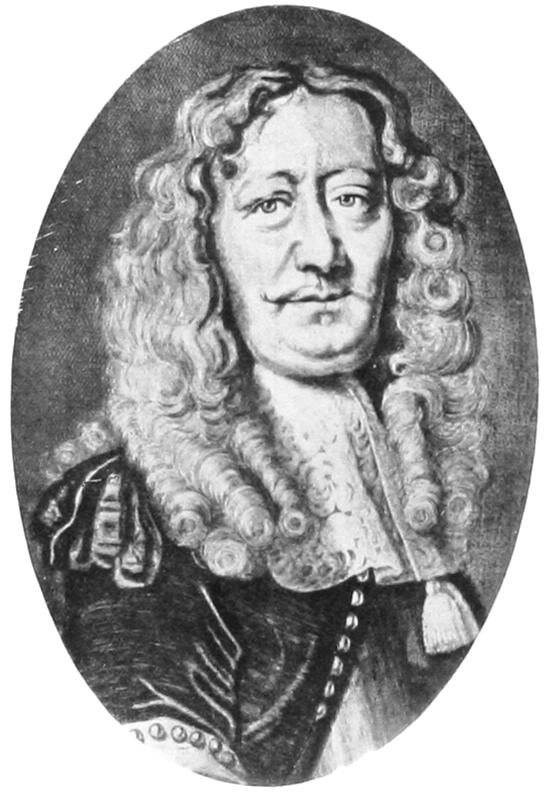
- Born: Henrik Ruse; 9 April 1624; Ruinen, Drenthe
- Died: 4 March 1679 (aged 54) Winsum

Henrik Ruse, Baron of Rysensteen (Note: also Henrick, Hendrick, Hendrik, Henri, Henry; Rusensteen, Russenstein, Rusenstein) (né Henrik Ruse (Note: also Rüse, Rusius, Ryse) 9 April 1624 – 22 February 1679) was a Dutch officer and fortification engineer. Following a period when he served in various armies in Germany and Italy, he wrote a well-researched book documenting the latest trends in fortification systems across Europe. As a result, he was entrusted with commissions for improving defences in his native Amsterdam, in Germany, and finally in Denmark and Norway where, benefitting from the support of the monarchy, he first became a general and later a baron. Ruse died in Sauwerd near Groningen in the Netherlands.

== Early life and education ==
Ruse was born in the village of Ruinen in the Dutch province of Drenthe. His father, Johan Ruse, who was the parish priest in Ruinen, belonged to a Huguenot family from eastern France, sympathising with the Protestant theologian Jacobus Arminius. Unlike his brothers who studied in Franeker, at the age of 15 Ruse began a military career where he saw action under the flags of France and Venice.

He took part in the Battle of Freiburg (1644), the Battle of Alerheim (1645) and was active at Philippsburg, serving the Prince de Condé and the Vicomte de Turenne. In 1646, he went to Bergamo and Venice and served under General Leonardo Foscolo in Dalmatia. In 1648, the Venetian army occupied Dugopolje and moved up to Ragusa. As the Turks had occupied the island of Crete the Venetian army went as far as Risan, Bar and Budva in order to occupy Albania. When Foscolo was appointed to defend Candia in 1651, Ruse decided to leave the army because of problems with his legs, and on his way back, he paid great attention to defence systems and facilities.

In August 1651 he was appointed by the city is an engineer for Amsterdam's defences. He criticized the fortification plans of Amsterdam burgomasters Frans Banninck Cocq, Johan Huydecoper van Maarsseveen, Cornelis Bicker and Nicolaes Tulp. In 1652, he became a captain in the civic guard, charged with an infantry company. In 1654, profiting from his careful study of various types of fortification, he completed Versterckte vesting, uitgevonden in velerleij voorvallen en geobserveert in deze laatste oorloogen, a work which sought to offer scientific explanations for the most recent requirements of defensive fortifications.

On 2 June 1654, he married Susanna Dubbengiesser or Toppengiesser from Stockholm. They had three daughters: Maria, Anna Isabelle and Johanna (Jeanne) Maria. Johanna Maria was the only one to survive. In Amsterdam Ruse worked as an architect, designed a public building, a few houses and invested in the import of Norwegian timber piles and real estate, which was intended for shipwharves. He is also said to have designed the church in Hoogeveen. In 1658 he had bought a small country estate in Sauwerd.

Without being completely relieved of his duties in the Netherlands, Ruse went on to realise various fortification assignments for John Maurice, Prince of Nassau-Siegen, including the huge citadel at Kalkar, and for Christian Louis, Duke of Brunswick-Lüneburg, the most important of which was the fortification of Harburg in 1660.

== Danish assignments ==
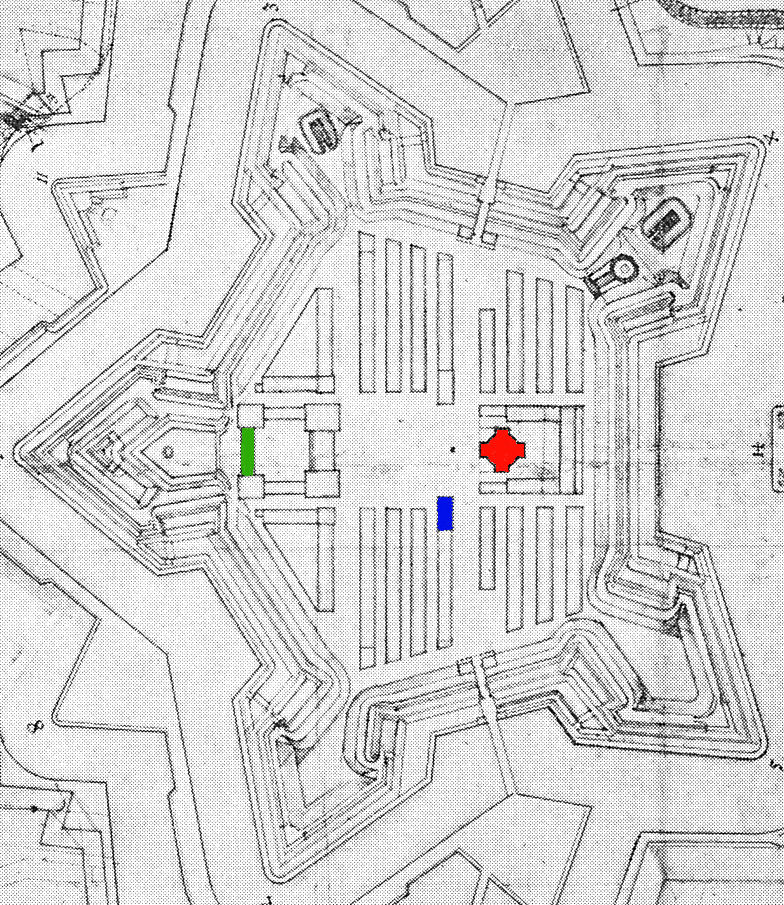
Plan for the Copenhagen Citadel

After the peace treaty at the end of the Second Northern War in 1660, Frederick III of Denmark-Norway commissioned Ruse to reconstruct the damaged fortifications of Copenhagen. In 1661, he was appointed quartermaster general, chief inspector of fortifications and colonel of an infantry regiment. Ruse immediately submitted a plan for rebuilding the Copenhagen citadel which was accepted. Construction work, completed three years later, caused some bitterness among the local citizens, leading as far as threats to Ruse's life.

In 1667, Ruse also completed the defences of Frederiksort in the Duchy of Schleswig. He travelled around Denmark, inspecting and repairing the defences, especially those in Kronborg, Nyborg and Fredericia. Thereafter he was involved in large-scale civil construction work in Copenhagen including cemeteries and monuments including the one to Corfitz Ulfeldt. But above all, he drew up plans for two new districts, one to the northeast of Kongens Nytorv and Gothersgade (Frederiksstaden) which included the Nyhavn Canal, the other southwest of Slotsholmen (Frederiksholm).

In 1664, Ruse was appointed major general and member of the war cabinet. With the threat of war with England, he was sent to Norway together with Frederik Ahlefeldt in 1667. In 1669, he became commander of Fredericia and, in 1671, commander in chief responsible for fortifications in the duchies. From 1667 to 1670, he also coordinated significant extensions to the Copenhagen and Christianshavn ramparts.

His next major work, during the last year of Frederick III's reign, was the rebuilding of the fortifications at Rendsburg in Schleswig. Ruse justified his efforts explaining that Denmark needed to be protected from the south, with additional defences in Sonderburg and Friedrichsort on the western shore of Kiel Fjord. In this way, the entire area could be systematically defended.

He had hoped to undertake a much more extensive project on both sides of the River Eider but this was hampered by resistance from Hans von Schack, an influential military expert. At the beginning of Christian V's reign, he rebuilt the entrenchments on a small island in the River Elbe and completed a comprehensive report on the fortification system for the Danish-Norwegian monarchy.

== Titles and property ==
Two canal houses, called twins, both with neckgables on Keizersgracht, designed by H. Ruse

In 1664, Ruse obtained the property rights for Bøvling Palace and its estate with responsibility for the Bøvling district near Ringkøbing in the west of Jutland. He resigned his post in 1671. BOEVLING slot and estate estate were elevated to the status of feudal barony of Rysensteen in 1672. Ruse, who had already become a Danish nobleman in 1664, was among the earliest nobles who became feudal barons according to the law of 25 May 1671, which completely restructured the Danish nobility, creating the only two classes of feudal counts and feudal berons, who since then constituted Danish High Society.

In the same year he was awarded the Order of the Dannebrog. Ruse owned property in Copenhagen including Bremerholms Admiralsgård outside the old Østerport. In Holstein, he had property in Glückstadt and in the Netherlands he had an establishment in Sauwerd near Groningen as well as property in the fourth urban planning of Amsterdam.

== Assignments in Norway ==
Under Christian V in 1673, with the support of the influential Hans von Schack, a Schleswig nobleman, Ruse was sent to Trondheim in Norway where he was appointed lieutenant general with responsibility for the Nordenfjells and Trondheim infantry regiments. In 1675, he was called to Christiania to participate in preparations for the Scanian War. When war broke out in September, Ruse spent the winter with his troops between Frederiksstad and Frederikshald. In 1676, he joined Ulrik Frederik Gyldenløve on a campaign in Sweden. Despite considerable success in Norway, Ruse was not happy about his stay there as it caused him appreciable losses on his interests in Rendsburg while his professional expertise was no longer in demand.

== Scanian War ==
In 1677, the king allowed him to leave Norway and sent him to Scania to lead the infantry, artillery and fortifications staff during the Scanian War. But luck was not on Ruse's side. The storming of Malmö on 26 June was not successful, nor was the Battle of Landskrona on 14 July. He was then appointed governor of Landskrona with orders to improve the fortifications. However, in the absence of manpower and supplies and in the face of opposition from Field Marshal Joachim Rüdiger von der Goltz who was given the supreme command of Scania, he was unable to complete the assignment. In a letter dated 28 August, Ruse complained in quite bitter terms that he was unable to carry out his work and requested retirement. Without further hesitation, King Christian V suspended him from his command and set up a committee to examine his conduct during the entire campaign. Ruse's defence consisted of a lengthy complaint criticising lack of support from von der Goltz, a position which was upheld by the examining committee.

== Decease ==
On 4 December 1677, Ruse obtained his retirement and pending remuneration, with instructions not to serve Denmark-Norway's enemies and to return to Denmark without delay if the king so required. But already on 22 February 1679, he died and was buried in Sauwerd in the Netherlands.

== Bibliography ==
- Ruse, Hendrik: The strengthening of strong-holds: invented on several occasions and practised during the late wars, as well in the United Provinces, as in France, Germany, Italy, Dalmatia, Albania, and the neighbouring countries. Publisher In the Savoy: Printed by the assigns of John Bill and Christopher Barker. 1668. Translation of: Versterckte vesting. 53p.
- Ruse, Henrik: Versterckte Vesting uytgevonden in velerley voorvallen en geobserveert in dese laetste Oorlogen, soo in de Vereenigde Nederlanden, als in Varnckryck, Duyts-Lant, Italien, Dalmatien, Albanien, en die daer angelegen landen. Amsterdam 1654.
- Freiwald, Karl-Heinz: Rendsburg im Wandel der Zeiten, Rendsburg 1986.
- Galland, Georg: Der Grosse Kurfürst und Moritz von Nassau, der Brasilianer. Studien zur Brandenburgischen und Holländischen Kunstgeschichte, Heinrich Keller, Frankfurt am Main, 1893.
- Jahn, J.H.F.: Henrik Ruse, Baron af Rysensteen Copenhagen 1848. 104 p.
- Jonge, J.C. de: Over Hendrik Ruse S.l. 1843.
- Kramm, Christian & J. Immerzeel jr.: De levens en werken der Hollandsche en Vlaamsche kunstschilders, beeldhouwers, graveurs en bouwmeesters van het begin der vijftiende eeuw tot heden. J.C. v. Kestern & Gebr. Diederichs Verlag, 1842-1861 (5 Bände).
