= Mulder's sign =

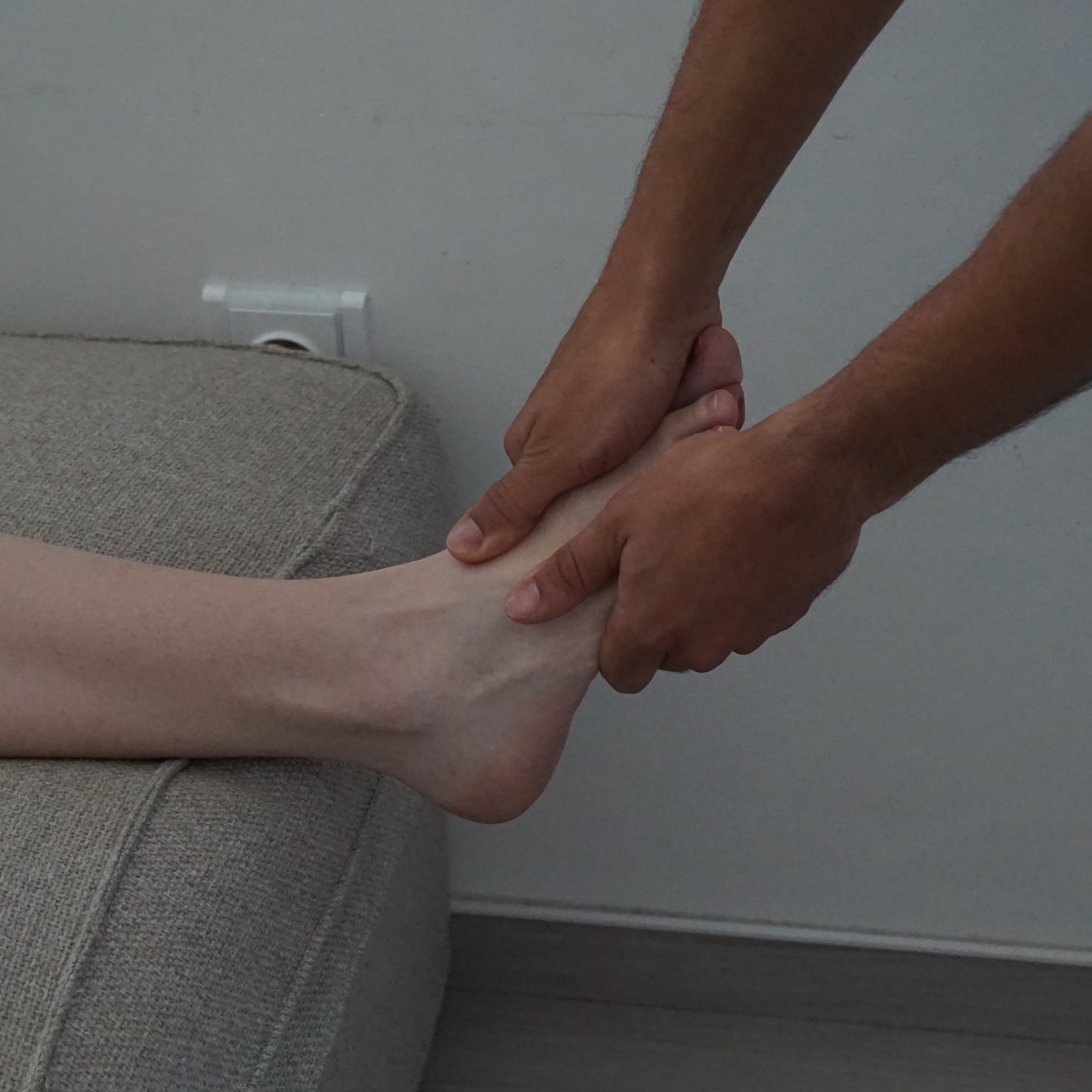
- A photo conveying mulder's sign being performed on the right foot.
- Differential diagnosis: Morton's neuroma

Mulder's sign is a physical exam finding associated with Morton's neuroma, which may be elicited while the patient is in the supine position on the examination table. The pain of the neuroma, as well as a click, can be produced by squeezing the two metatarsal heads together with one hand, while concomitantly putting pressure on the interdigital space with the other hand. With this technique, the pain of the Morton's neuroma will be localized strictly to the plantar surface of the involved interspace, with paresthesias radiating into the affected toes.

== Eponym ==
It is named after the Dutch surgeon and podiatrist, Jacob D. Mulder (1901–1965).
