= James Arnott (physician) =

English physician

James Arnott (1797-1883) was an English physician and pioneer of cryotherapy. Regarded as “the father of modern cryosurgery”, Arnott was the first to utilize extreme cold locally for the destruction of tissue. In 1819, Arnott began his practice of cryotherapy to freeze tumors in the treatment of breast and uterine cancers.
