= Cryotherapy =

Local or general use of low temperatures in medical therapy

Cryotherapy, sometimes known as cold therapy, is the local or general use of low temperatures in medical therapy. Cryotherapy can be used in many ways, including whole-body exposure for therapeutic health benefits, or locally to treat a variety of tissue lesions.

Cryotherapy is often used in an effort to prevent or relieve muscle pain, sprains, and swelling after soft tissue damage or surgery. When a musculoskeletal injury occurs, the body sends signals to the inflammatory cells, macrophages, which release IGF-1. IGF-1 is a hormone-insulin-like growth factor which initiates the termination of damaged tissue. In some cases, this inflammatory response can be aggravated and cause increased swelling and edema, which can prolong the recovery process.It is hypothesized that the practice originated from James Arnott (1797-1883), a senior physician of Brighton Infirmary, that applied a mixture of salt and crushed ice to tumors in the hopes that it would reduce pain and inflammation at the tumor site. It became more widespread after more research was done in the 1970s by Japanese rheumatologist Toshima Yamaguchi. It became more popular in Europe, USA and Australia in the 1980s and 1990s.

It has been commonly used to accelerate recovery in athletes after exercise. Cryotherapy decreases the temperature of tissue surfaces to minimize hypoxic cell death, edema accumulation, and muscle spasms. Minimising each or all of these ultimately alleviates discomfort and inflammation. It can involve a range of treatments, from the application of ice packs or immersion in ice baths (generally known as cold therapy), to the use of cold chambers.

== Mechanism of action ==
When the body is subjected to extreme cooling, the blood vessels are narrowed which reduces blood flow to the areas of swelling. Once outside the cryogenic chamber, the vessels expand, and an increased presence of anti-inflammatory proteins (IL-10) is established in the blood. The treatment typically involves exposing the individual to freezing, dry temperatures (at −40 °C) for 2 to 4 minutes in one of these chambers. While in the cryotherapy chamber, blood flow is reduced in that injured area. This will reduce muscle spasms and soreness. This is important to activate the circulatory system to encourage healing and regenerate muscle fibers.

== Cryosurgery ==
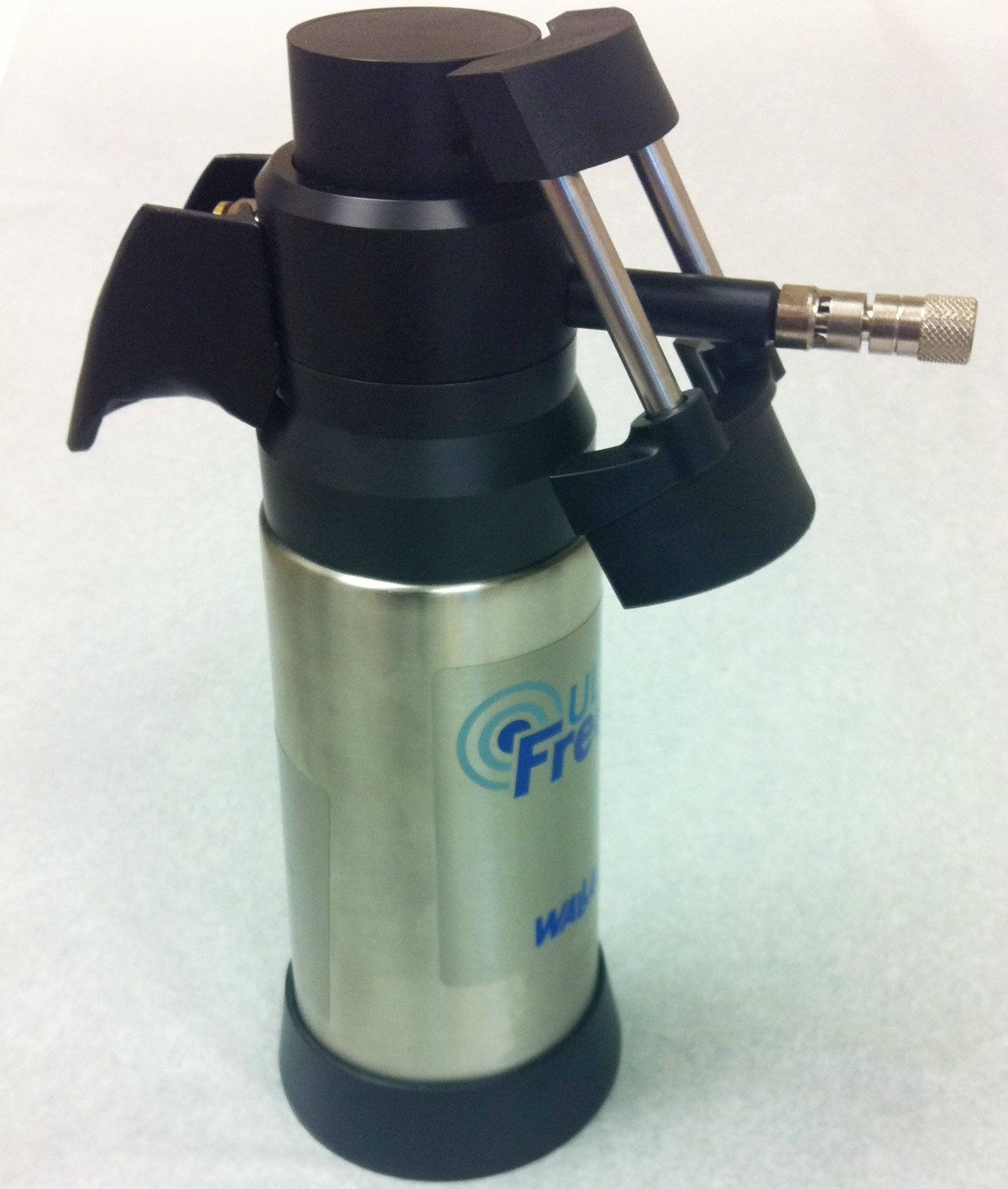
Medical cryotherapy gun

Cryosurgery is the application of extreme cold to destroy abnormal or diseased tissue. The application of ultra-cold liquid causes damage to the treated tissue due to intracellular ice formation. The degree of damage depends upon the minimum temperature achieved and the rate of cooling. Cryosurgery is used to treat a number of diseases and disorders, most especially skin conditions like warts, moles, skin tags and solar keratoses. Liquid nitrogen is usually used to freeze the tissues at the cellular level. The procedure is used often as it is relatively easy and quick, can be done in the doctor's office, and is deemed quite low risk. If a cancerous lesion is suspected, then excision rather than cryosurgery may be deemed more appropriate. Contraindications to the use of cryosurgery include but are not limited to using it over a neoplasm, someone with conditions that are worsened by exposure to cold (e.g., Raynaud syndrome, urticaria), and poor circulation or no sensation in the area. There are some precautions to using cryosurgery. They include someone with collagen vascular disease, dark-skinned individuals (due to high risk of hypopigmentation), and impaired sensation at the area being treated.

== Ice pack therapy ==
Ice pack therapy is a treatment of cold temperatures to an injured area of the body. Though the therapy is extensively used, and it is agreed that it alleviates symptoms, testing has produced conflicting results about its efficacy and possibility of producing undesirable results.

An ice pack is placed over an injured area and is intended to absorb heat of a closed traumatic or edematous injury by using conduction to transfer thermal energy. Cold decreases muscle spindle fiber activity and slows nerve conduction velocity; Therefore, It is commonly used to alleviate the pain of minor injuries and decrease muscle soreness. The use of ice packs in treatment decreases the blood flow most rapidly at the beginning of the cooling period; Although cryotherapy has been shown to aid in muscle recovery, some studies have highlighted that the degree of muscle cooling in humans is not significant enough to produce a considerable effect on muscle recovery. Based on previous research comparing human and animal models, the insufficient degree of cooling is due to larger limb size, more adipose tissue, and a higher muscle diameter in humans.

Although there are many positive effects of cryotherapy in athletes' short-term recovery, in recent years, there has been much controversy regarding whether cryotherapy is actually beneficial or may be detrimental. While inflammation that occurs post-injury or from a damaging exercise may be detrimental to secondary tissue, it is beneficial for the structural and functional repair of the damaged tissue. Therefore, some researchers are now recommending that ice not be used so as not to delay the natural healing process following an injury. The original RICE (rest, ice, compression, elevation) method was rescinded because the inflammatory response is necessary for the healing process, and this practice may delay healing instead of facilitating it. Animal studies also show that a disrupted inflammatory stage of healing may lead to impaired tissue repair and redundant collagen synthesis. There is also some evidence indicating that using ice pack therapy for longer than 10 minutes prior to exercise can negatively impact performance. Most studies conclude that cryotherapy has a positive impact on alleviating pain within the first 24 hours of a sport related activity. However the evidence on long-term recovery is still limited.

== Cryotherapy following total knee replacement ==
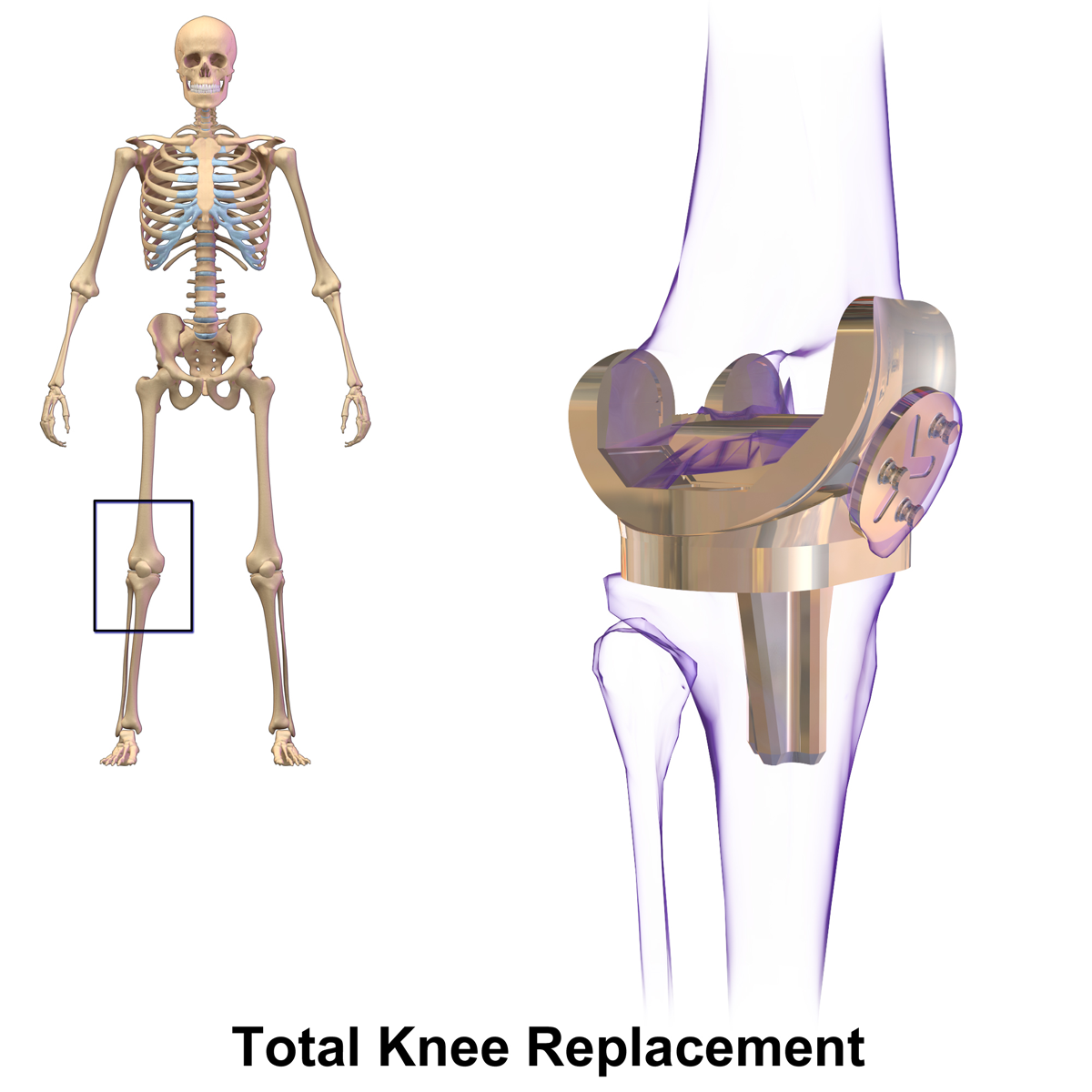
Total knee replacement

Cryotherapy may be associated with reducing inflammation and pain reduction. However, the effectiveness of cryotherapy on total knee arthroplasty (TKA) is still unclear. A systemic review found that six out of eight randomized controlled trails indicate that there is no significant benefit of using cryotherapy. The result may depend on several factors such as application time per session, duration and frequency of application of cryotherapy

Post-surgical management following total knee replacement surgery may include cryotherapy with the goal of helping with pain management and blood loss following surgery. It is applied using ice, cold water, or gel packs, sometimes in specialized devices that surround the skin and surgical site. Evidence from clinical trials regarding the long-term effectiveness of cryotherapy is weak and because of this, the use of cryotherapy may not be justified. Weak evidence indicates that cryotherapy used postoperatively may be associated with a small decrease in blood loss and pain following the surgery. No clinically significant improvements in range of motion have been reported. There are not many side effects or adverse effects reported with this intervention. Some studies suggest that cryotherapy may offer minor reductions in swelling and pain after total knee arthroplasty, but systematic reviews indicate that its overall effectiveness remains inconclusive. The application methods vary, with durations ranging from brief ice pack sessions to continuous cooling for up to 48 hours using automated devices. Further study is needed to assess any potential harms or adverse effects associated with cryotherapy after total knee arthroplasty.

== Traditional vs continuous cryotherapy after total knee arthroplasty ==
Cryotherapy, the withdrawal of heat from an individual's body via the application of cold modalities to reduce tissue temperature, has been known as a treatment intervention for the overall management of musculoskeletal injuries, especially when it comes to relieving pain and improving functional outcomes after total knee arthroplasty. Over the years, new cryotherapy devices that aim to maintain a fixed temperature for a prolonged time have become more apparent, thereby questioning both the efficacy and therapeutic outcomes of continuous cryotherapy with the ones of traditional cryotherapy.

The most concurrent systematic review and meta-analysis aimed to compare continuous and traditional applications of cryotherapy on patients who have undergone total knee arthroplasty, specifically in pain intensity, analgesics consumption, swelling, blood loss, postoperative range of motion (PROM), and length of hospital stay. According to the study's findings, there were no statistically significant differences in pain intensity, analgesic consumption, swelling, blood loss, PROM, and length of hospital stay between the continuous and traditional cryotherapy groups. At the same time, the study acknowledges its limitations, including lack of blinding, substantial heterogeneity, and modest sample sizes in eligible trials.

In addition to such findings, the study compared the financial implications of both continuous cryotherapy and traditional cryotherapy. They found that continuous cryotherapy may be subject to additional costs not covered by insurance. In contrast, the cost of traditional cryotherapy is nearly negligible.

With that in mind, continuous cryotherapy was shown to have produced similar clinical effects to traditional cryotherapy; the only difference being the additional costs that insurance companies do not cover with continuous cryotherapy. Therefore, the researchers state the current evidence isn't substantial enough to support the theoretical cost-effectiveness of continuous cryotherapy after total knee arthroplasty.

== Cold spray anesthetics ==
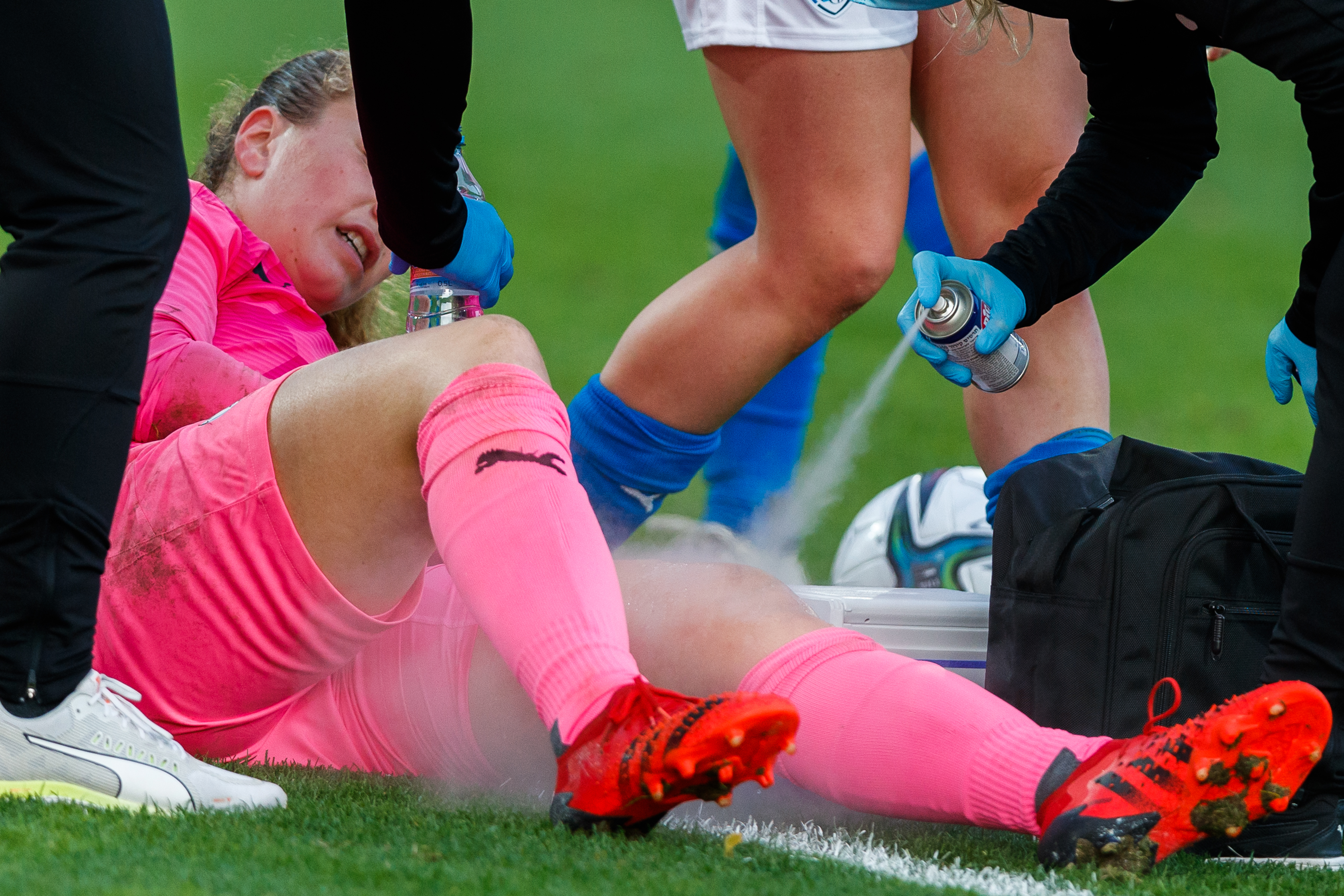
Cold spray anesthetic usage

In addition to their use in cryosurgery, several types of cold aerosol sprays are used for short-term pain relief. Unlike other cold modalities, it does not produce similar physiological effects due to the fact it decreases skin temperature, not muscle temperature. It reflexively inhibits underling muscle by using evaporation to cool the area. Ordinary spray cans containing tetrafluoroethane, dimethyl ether, or similar substances, are used to numb the skin prior to or possibly in place of local anesthetic injections, and prior to other needles, small incisions, sutures, and so on. Other products containing chloroethane are used to ease sports injuries, similar to ice pack therapy. Cold aerosol spray could also be used to relieve trigger points and improve range of motion. After applying the cold spray, one can stretch the muscle and will then have improved mobility and a decrease in pain immediately. However, this is a short-term effect, as the pain relief and improved range of motion can wear off within a minute.

== Whole-body cryotherapy ==
Whole-body cryotherapy typically uses a cryotherapy chamber which is a fully enclosed, walk-in room or chamber designed to expose the human body to ultra-low temperatures for 2–3 minutes. An increasing amount of research is done on the effects of whole-body cryotherapy on exercise, beauty, and health. Research is often inconsistent because of the usage of the different types of cryo chambers, and different treatment periods. However, most evidence suggests that whole-body cryotherapy has a positive effect on muscle soreness immediately after exercise.

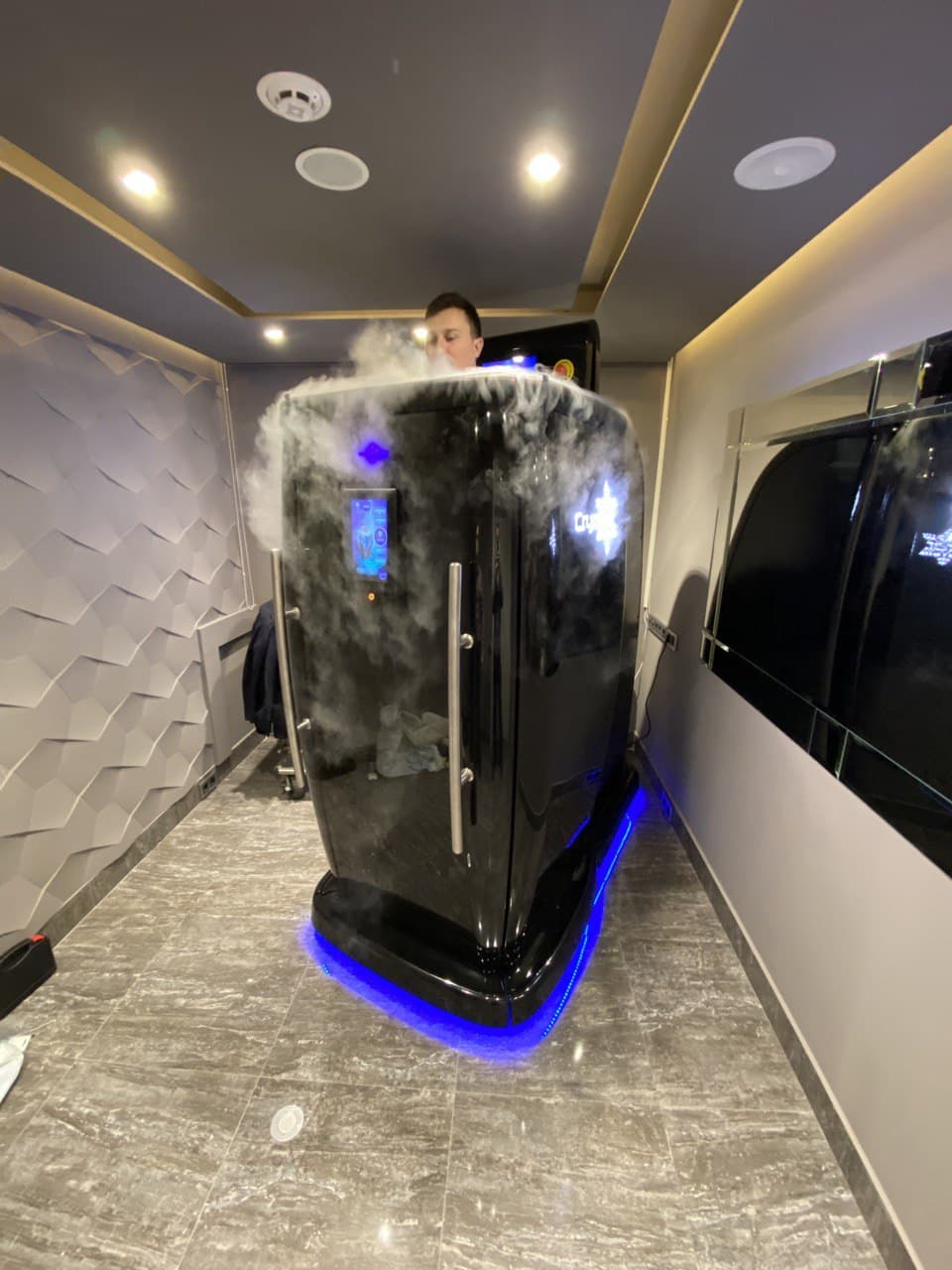
Cryotherapy chamber

Cryotherapy is also increasingly used as a non-drug treatment against rheumatoid arthritis, stress, anxiety, chronic pain, multiple sclerosis and fibromyalgia. Studies for these, and other diseases (Alzheimer's, migraines), are ongoing, although more evidence becomes available on the positive effects of whole-body cryotherapy. The FDA points out that the effects of whole-body cryotherapy lacks evidence and should be researched more.

Cryotherapy treatment involves exposing individuals to extremely cold dry air (below −100 °C) for two to four minutes. Yet three- to four-minute exposure to whole-body cryotherapy is different from one- to two-minute exposure. It is more beneficial to expose for a shorter time to increase therapeutic benefits. Longer durations have negative effects on thermal sensation, tissue oxygenation, and blood volume. The number of sessions is also an important part of the healing process, as just one session will not exhibit significant effects. A minimum of twenty sessions is required, and thirty sessions is recommended for optimal effects.

Whole-body cryotherapy is not commonly used prior to rehabilitation or performance because of its known adverse effects to performance such as decreased myotatic reflex and force production, as well as a slight decrease in balance immediately following cryotherapy for 20 minutes. Modalities like cold water immersion have also been shown to possibly slow and impair muscle protein synthesis and repair in recreational athletes, but equivalent controlled studies have not been done to see if the same effects hold true for local cryotherapy. Regardless, ice has been shown in studies to inhibit the uptake of dietary protein post-muscle conditioning exercise.

To achieve the subzero temperatures required for whole-body cryotherapy, two methods are typically used: liquid nitrogen and refrigerated cold air. During these exposures, individuals wear minimal clothing, which usually consists of shorts for males, and shorts and a crop top for females. Gloves, a woolen headband covering the ears, a nose and mouth mask, and dry shoes and socks are commonly worn to reduce the risk of cold-related injury. The first whole-body cryotherapy chamber was built in Japan in the late 1970s. It was introduced to Europe in the 1980s, and has been used in the US and Australia in the past decade.

=== Adverse effects ===
Reviews of whole-body cryotherapy have called for research studies to implement active surveillance of adverse events, which are suspected of being underreported. If the cold temperatures are produced by evaporating liquid nitrogen, there is the risk of inert gas asphyxiation as well as frostbite. However, these risks are not present in the electronically operated chambers.

=== Contraindications ===
Contraindications include patients with cardiovascular disease, arterial hypertension, acute infectious diseases, seizures, cold allergy, and some psychiatric disorders.

== See also ==
- Cryonics
- Cold shock response
- Cold compression therapy
- Freeze spray
