= Cryoneurolysis =

Medical procedure for nerve injury

- Specialty: Neurology
- Uses: Treating nerve injury

Cryoneurolysis, also referred to as cryoanalgesia, is a medical procedure that temporarily blocks nerve conduction along peripheral nerve pathways. The procedure, which inserts a small probe to freeze the target nerve, can facilitate complete regeneration of the structure and function of the affected nerve. Cryoneurolysis has been used to treat a variety of painful conditions.

== Medical uses ==
Cryoneuralysis has been used to relieve pain after thoracotomy, mastectomy, and knee or shoulder arthroplasty. Combined with ultrasound imaging, the procedure can be administered using a hand-held device in an office, and appears to provide an expedient, safe, and nonpharmacological option for treating various chronic pain conditions.

=== Occipital cryoneurolysis ===
Occipital cryoneurolysis is a procedure used to treat nerve pain generated by peripheral nerves (nerves located outside of the spinal column and skull) commonly due to the condition occipital neuralgia. A probe (no larger than a small needle) is carefully placed adjacent to the specific nerve. Once in the appropriate area the probe is first used to stimulate the affected nerve helping to verify positioning. Once certain of proper placement, the tip is cooled by nitrous oxide to temperatures between −50 and −70 °C (−58 and −94 °F) to envelope the nerve in an ice ball, thereby interrupting transmission. The nerve is still functional and returns to its normal (un-frozen) state immediately after the procedure is completed.

Side effects and adverse reactions are rare. Potential side effects or complications could include soreness from the procedure for a few days, trauma to the nerve, which may cause worsening of the pain or loss of nerve function, as well as infection or bleeding complications.

== Mechanisms of action ==
=== Nerve anatomy ===
Each nerve is composed of a bundle of axons. Each axon is surrounded by the endoneurium connective tissue layer. These axons are bundled into fascicles surrounded by the perineurium connective tissue layer. Multiple fascicles are then surrounded by the epineurium, which is the outermost connective tissue layer of the nerve. The axons of myelinated nerves have a myelin sheath made up of Schwann cells that coat the axon.

=== Classification and mechanism ===
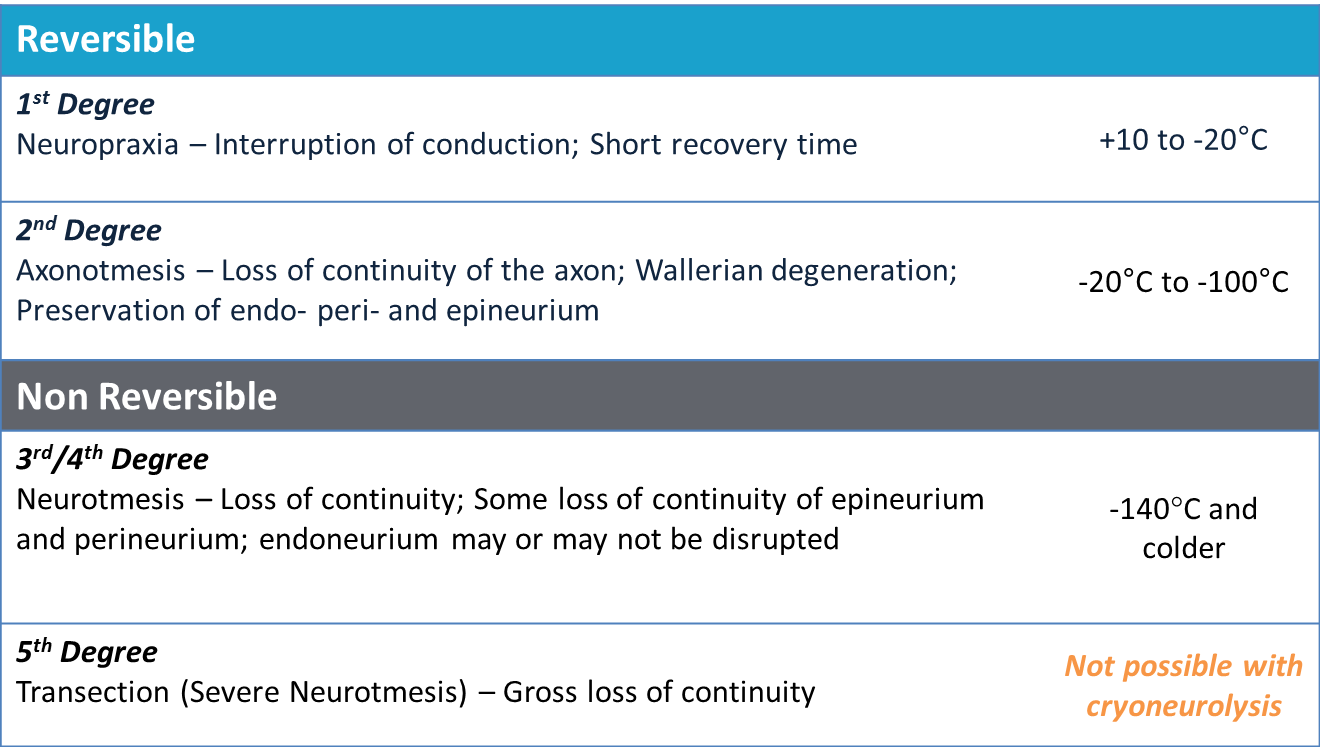
Nerve injury classification table of temperatures required for injury and pain relief

Classification of nerve damage was well-defined by Sir Herbert Seddon and Sunderland in a system that remains in use. The adjacent table details the forms (neurapraxia, axonotmesis and neurotmesis) and degrees of nerve injury that occur as a result of exposure to various temperatures, with the intent to interrupt nerve traffic and relieve pain.

Cryoneurolysis treatments that use nitrous oxide (boiling point of −88.5 °C) as the coolant fall in the range of an axonotmesis injury, or 2nd degree injury, according to the Sunderland classification system. Treatments of the nerve in this temperature range are reversible, usually within a few months. Nerves treated in this temperature range experience a disruption of the axon, with Wallerian degeneration occurring distal to the site of injury. The axon and myelin sheath are affected, but all of the connective tissues (endoneurium, perineurium, and epineurium) remain intact. Following Wallerian degeneration, the axon regenerates along the original nerve path at a rate of approximately 1–2 mm per day.

Cryoneurolysis differs from cryoablation in that cryoablation treatments use liquid nitrogen (boiling point of −195.8 °C) as the coolant, and therefore, fall into the range of a neurotmesis injury, or 3rd degree injury according to the Sunderland classification. Treatments of the nerve in this temperature range are irreversible. Nerves treated in this temperature range experience a disruption of both the axon and the endoneurium connective tissue layer.

The efficacy of cryoneurolysis procedures for pain relief depend on the proximity of the probe to the targeted nerve, surface area of tissue covered by the probe, the rate and duration of cold treatment, and the temperature applied. These variables likely contributed during a trial by Nygaard et al. observing the efficacy of cryoprobe based cryoneuolysis. The group concluded that "when viewed across all assessed timepoints, the results indicate that cryoneurolysis has no meaningful, robust benefit over sham for chronic knee pain."

== History ==
The use of cold for pain relief and as an anti-inflammatory has been known since the time of Hippocrates (460–377 BC). Since then there have been numerous accounts of ice used for pain relief, including from the Ancient Egyptians and Avicenna of Persia (982–1070 AD). In 1812, Napoleon's surgeon general noted that half-frozen soldiers from the Moscow battle were able to tolerate amputations with reduced pain. In 1851, ice and salt mixtures were promoted by Arnott for the treatment of nerve pain. Campbell White, in 1899, was the first to use refrigerants medically, and Allington, in 1950, was the first to use liquid nitrogen for medical treatments. In 1961, Cooper et al. created an early cryoprobe that reached −190 °C using liquid nitrogen. Shortly thereafter, in 1967, an ophthalmic surgeon named Amoils used carbon dioxide and nitrous oxide to create a cryoprobe that reached −70 °C.

== Devices ==
=== Cryoprobe ===
Cryoneurolysis is performed with a cryoprobe, which is composed of a hollow cannula that contains a smaller inner lumen. The pressurized coolant (nitrous oxide, carbon dioxide or liquid nitrogen) travels down the lumen and expands at the end of the lumen into the tip of the hollow cannula. No coolant exits the cryoprobe. The expansion of the pressurized liquid causes the surrounding area to cool (known as the Joule–Thomson effect) and the phase change of the liquid to gas also causes the surrounding area to cool. This causes a visible iceball to form and the tissue surrounding the end of the cryoprobe to freeze. The gas form of the coolant then travels up the length of the cryoprobe and is safely expelled. The tissue surrounding the end of the cryoprobe can reach as low as −88.5 °C with nitrous oxide as the coolant, and as low as −195.8 °C with liquid nitrogen. Temperatures below −100 °C are damaging to nerves.

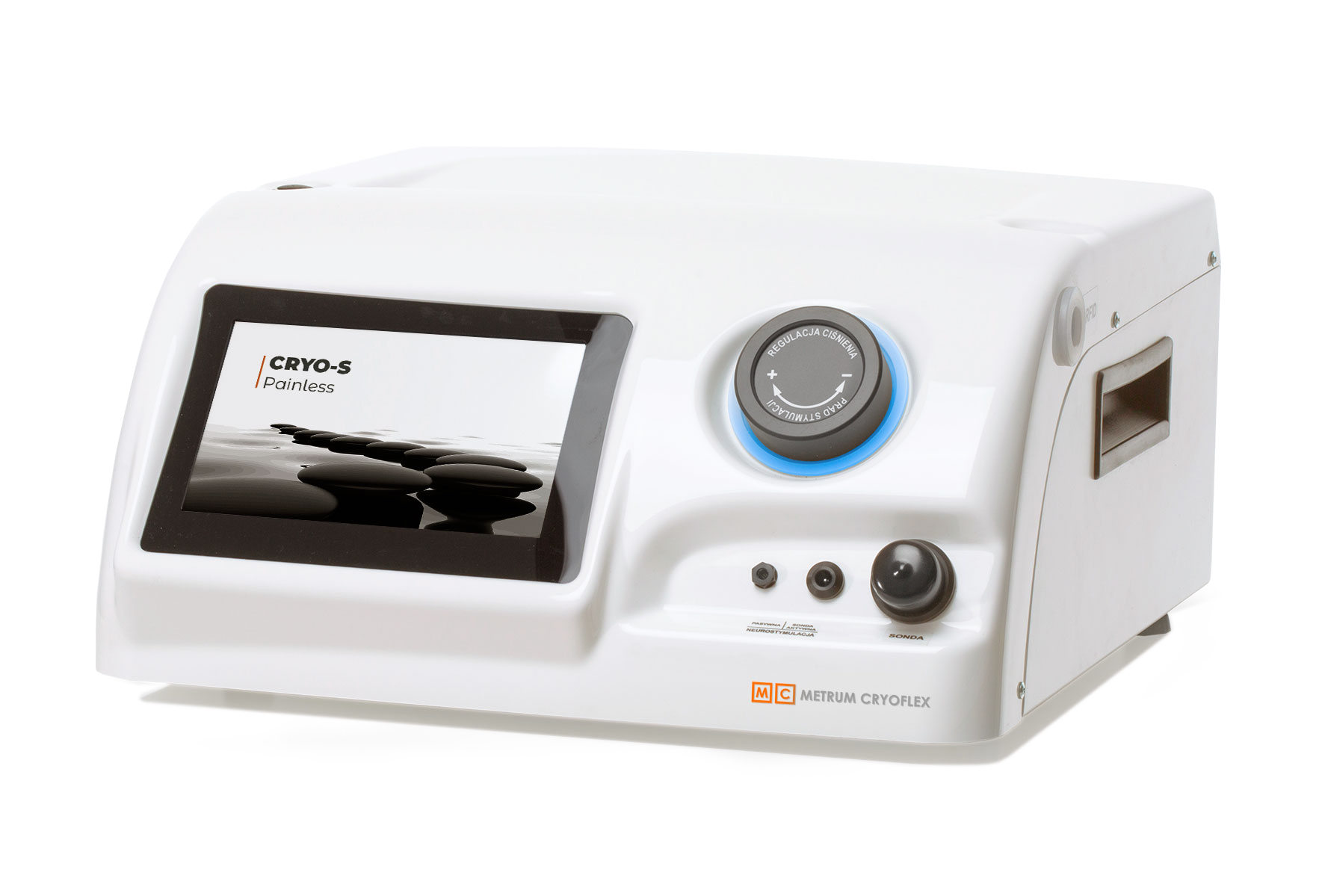

Cryo-S Painless cryoanalgesia device is the next generation of apparatus used by many experts in the field since 1992. The working medium for Cryo-S Painless is carbon dioxide: CO_{2} (−78 °C) or nitrous oxide: N_{2}O (−89 °C), very efficient and easy to use gases. Cryo-S Painless is controlled by a microprocessor and all the parameters are displayed and monitored on a LCD screen. Mode selection probe, cleaning and freezing can be performed automatically using footswitch or touch screen which allows to keep the site of a procedure under sterile conditions. Electronic communication (chip system) between the connected probe and device allows recognition of optimal operating parameters and auto-configures to cryoprobe characteristics. Pressure and gas flow are set automatically, any manual adjustment is not necessary. Cryoprobe temperature, cylinder pressure, gas flow inside of cryoprobe and procedure time are displayed during freezing. Built-in voice communication Built-in neurostimulation (sensory, motor).

=== Other devices ===
The Endocare PerCryo Percutaneous Cryoablation device utilizes argon as a coolant and can be used with four different single cryoprobe configurations with a diameter of either 1.7 mm (~16 gauge) or 2.4 mm (~13 gauge) in diameter .

The Myoscience (acquired by Pacira in 2019) Iovera is a handheld device that uses nitrous oxide as a coolant and can be used with a three-probe configuration with a probe diameter of 0.4 mm (~27 gauge).
