= Cryosurgery =

Cauterization by freezing tissue

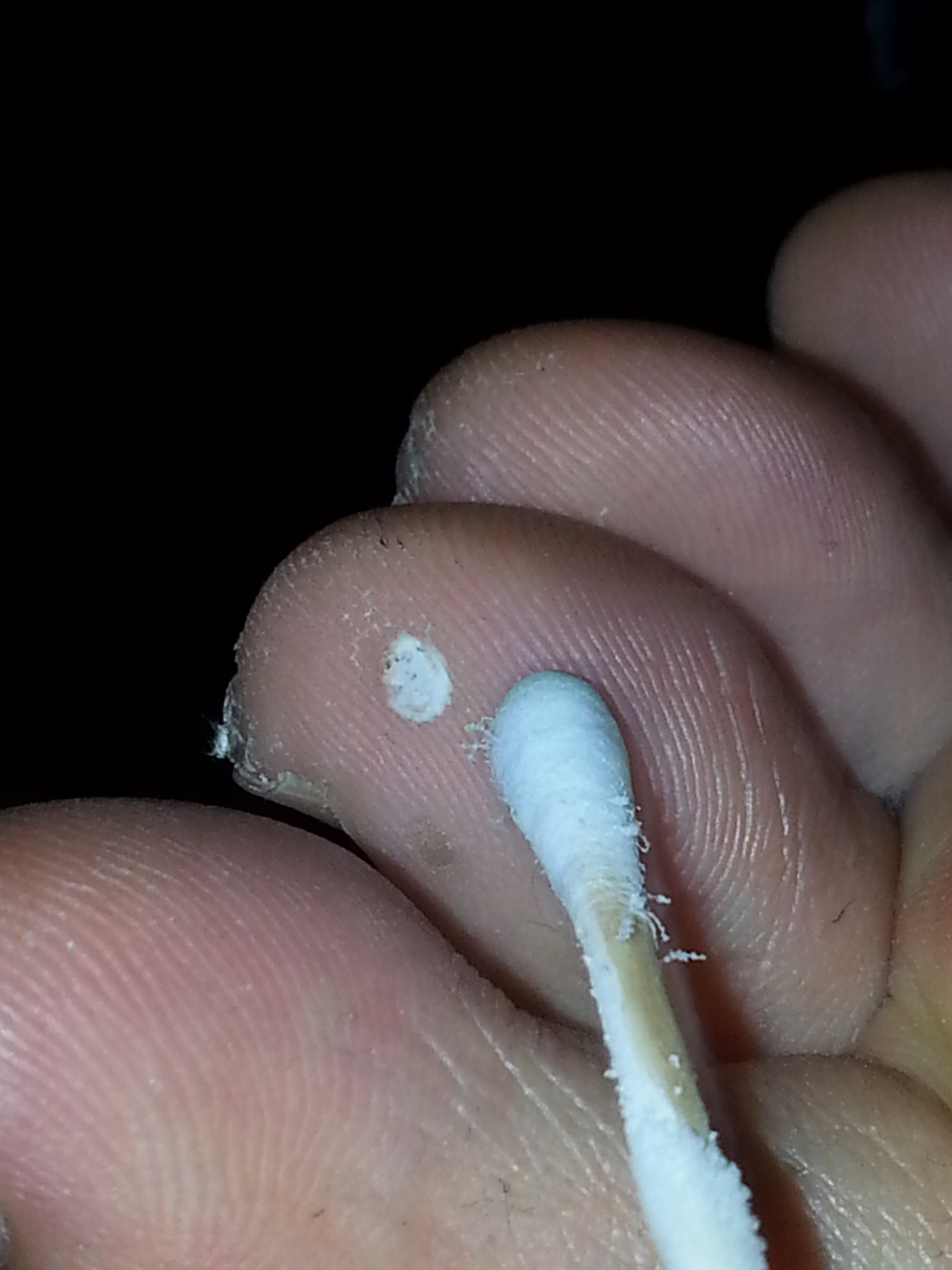
- Cryotherapy to a plantar wart using cotton bud application
- Other names: cryotherapy

Cryosurgery (with cryo from the Ancient Greek κρύο 'icy cold') is the use of extreme cold in surgery to destroy abnormal or diseased tissue; thus, it is the surgical application of cryoablation. Cryosurgery has been historically used to treat a number of diseases and disorders, especially a variety of benign and malignant skin conditions.

== History ==
In 1849, English physician James Arnott described therapeutic applications of extremely cold temperatures, namely a mixture of crushed ice and salt applied locally (to skin or mucous membrane). He theorized his technique was capable of "arresting the accompanying inflammation and perhaps destroying the vitality of the cancer cell." His works were the first to hypothesize that extreme cold could be used to selectively damage or destroy harmful tissue.

== Uses ==
Warts, moles, skin tags, solar keratoses, molluscum, Morton's neuroma and small skin cancers are candidates for cryosurgical treatment. Several internal disorders are also treated with cryosurgery, including liver cancer, prostate cancer, lung cancer, oral cancers, cervical disorders and, more commonly in the past, hemorrhoids. Soft tissue conditions such as plantar fasciitis (jogger's heel) and fibroma (benign excrescence of connective tissue) can be treated with cryosurgery.

Cryosurgery works by taking advantage of the destructive force of freezing temperatures on cells. When their temperature sinks beyond a certain level, ice crystals begin forming inside the cells and, because of their lower density, eventually tear apart those cells. Further harm to malignant growth will result once the blood vessels supplying the affected tissue begin to freeze.

Cryosurgery is used to treat a variety of benign skin lesions including:

- Acne
- Dermatofibroma
- Hemangioma
- Keloid (hypertrophic scar)
- Molluscum contagiosum
- Myxoid cyst
- Pyogenic granuloma
- Seborrheic keratoses
- Skin tags
- Warts (including anogenital warts)

Cryosurgery may also be used to treat low-risk skin cancers such as basal cell carcinoma and squamous cell carcinoma but a biopsy should be obtained first to confirm the diagnosis, determine the depth of invasion and characterize other high-risk histologic features.

== Method ==
=== Liquid nitrogen ===
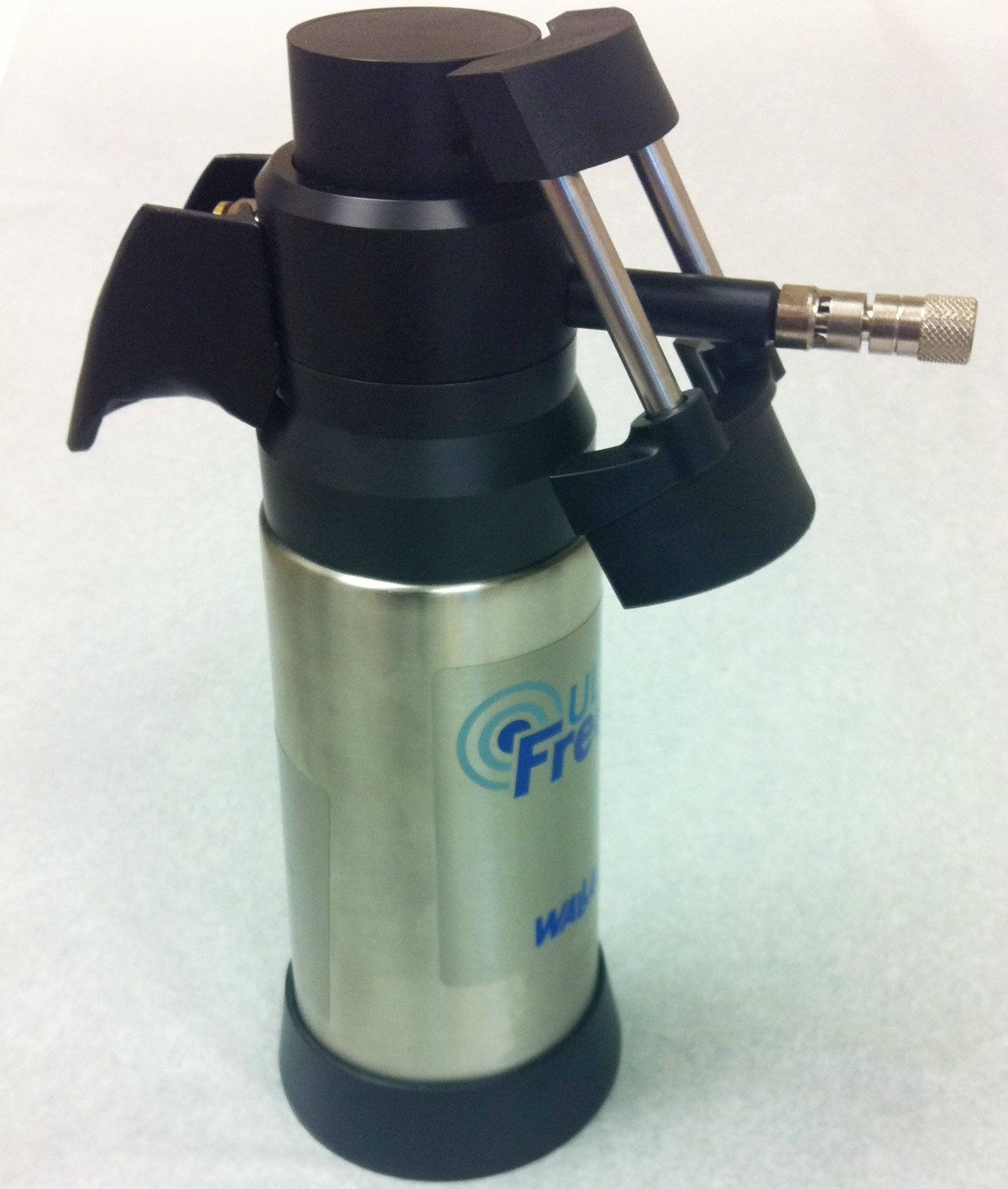
Cryogun used to spray liquid nitrogen

A common method of freezing lesions is by using liquid nitrogen as the cryogen. The liquid nitrogen may be applied to lesions using a variety of methods, such as dipping a cotton or synthetic material tipped applicator in liquid nitrogen and then directly applying the cryogen onto the lesion. The liquid nitrogen can also be sprayed onto the lesion using a spray canister. The spray canister may utilize a variety of nozzles for different spray patterns. A cryoprobe, which is a metal applicator that has been cooled using liquid nitrogen, can also be directly applied onto lesions.

=== Carbon dioxide ===
Carbon dioxide is also available as a spray and is used to treat a variety of benign spots. Less frequently, doctors use carbon dioxide "snow" formed into a cylinder or mixed with acetone to form a slush that is applied directly to the treated tissue.

=== Argon ===
Recent advances in technology have allowed for the use of argon gas to drive ice formation using a principle known as the Joule-Thomson effect. This gives physicians excellent control of the ice and minimizes complications using ultra-thin 17 gauge cryoneedles.

=== Freeze sprays ===
A mixture of dimethyl ether and propane is used in some "freeze spray" preparations such as Dr. Scholl's Freeze Away. The mixture is stored in an aerosol spray type container at room temperature and drops to −41 °C (−42 °F) when dispensed. The mixture is often dispensed into a straw with a cotton-tipped swab. Similar products may use tetrafluoroethane or other substances.

== Products ==
Cryosurgical systems

A number of medical supply companies have developed cryogen delivery systems for cryosurgery. Most are based on the use of liquid nitrogen, although some employ the use of proprietary mixtures of gases that combine to form the cryogen.

== In cancer treatment ==
Cryosurgery is also used to treat internal and external tumors as well as tumors in the bone. To cure internal tumors, a hollow instrument called a cryoprobe is used, which is placed in contact with the tumor. Liquid nitrogen or argon gas is passed through the cryoprobe. Ultrasound or MRI is used to guide the cryoprobe and monitor the freezing of the cells. This helps in limiting damage to adjacent healthy tissues. A ball of ice crystals forms around the probe which results in freezing of nearby cells. When it is required to deliver gas to various parts of the tumor, more than one probe is used. After cryosurgery, the frozen tissue is either naturally absorbed by the body in the case of internal tumors, or it dissolves and forms a scab for external tumors.

== Results ==
Cryosurgery is a minimally invasive procedure and is often preferred to other types of surgery because of its safety, ease of use, minimal pain and scarring as well as low cost; however, as with any medical treatment, there are risks involved, primarily that of damage to nearby healthy tissue. Damage to nerve tissue is of particular concern but is rare.

Cryosurgery cannot be used on lesions that would subsequently require biopsy as the technique destroys tissue and precludes the use of histopathology.

More common complications of cryosurgery include blistering and edema which are transient. Cryosurgery may cause complications due to damage of underlying structures. Destruction of the basement membrane may cause scarring and destruction of hair follicles can cause alopecia or hair loss. Occasionally, hypopigmentation may occur in the area of skin treated with cryosurgery, however, this complication is usually transient and often resolves as melanocytes migrate and repigment the area over several months. Bleeding can also occur, which can be delayed or immediate, due to damage of underlying arteries and arterioles. Tendon rupture and cartilage necrosis can occur, particularly if cryosurgery is done over bony prominences. These complications can be avoided or minimized if freeze times of less than 30 seconds are used during cryosurgery.

Patients undergoing cryosurgery usually experience redness and minor-to-moderate localized pain, which most of the time can be alleviated sufficiently by oral administration of mild analgesics such as ibuprofen, codeine or acetaminophen (paracetamol). Blisters may form as a result of cryosurgery, but these usually scab over and peel away within a few days.

== See also ==
- Chemical cautery
- Cryoneurolysis
- Cryotherapy
- Electrosurgery
