= Skin temperature =

Temperature at the outer surface of a living body

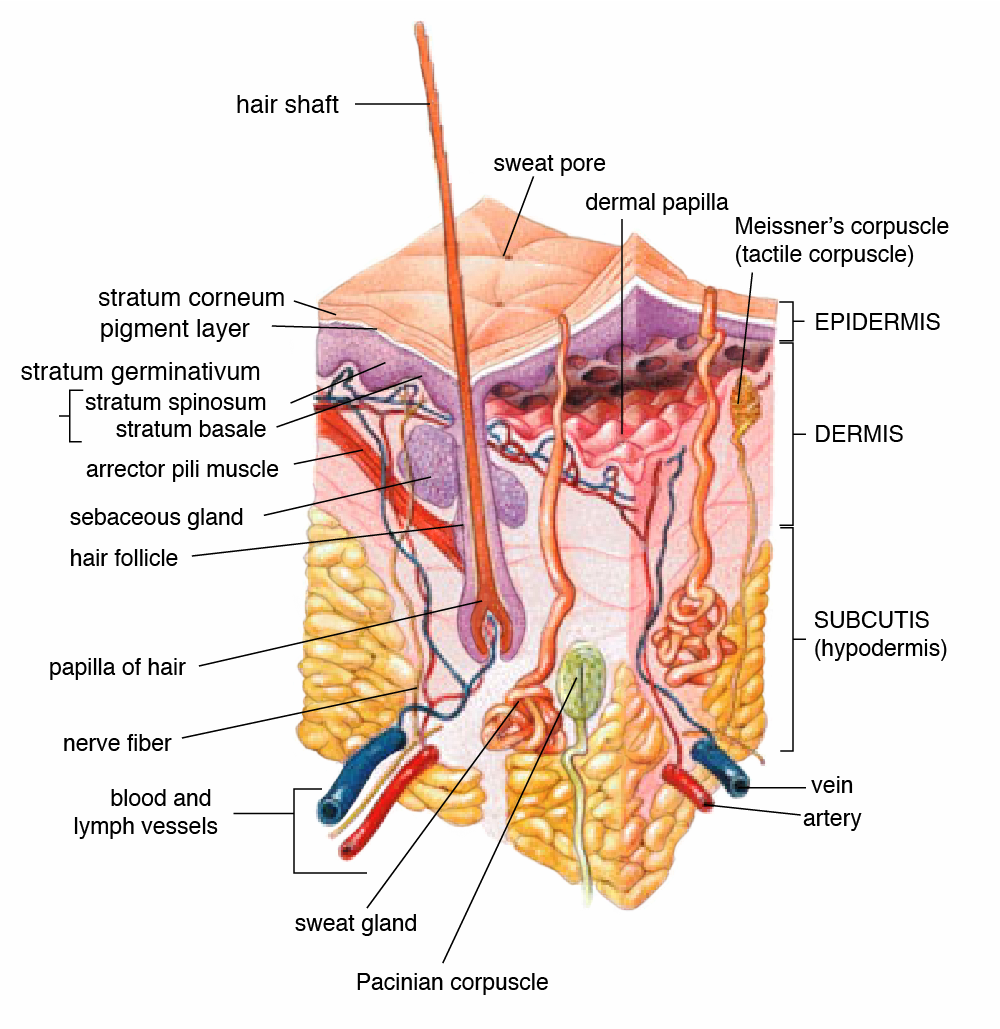
Anatomy of the human skin

Skin temperature is the temperature of the outermost surface of the body. Normal human skin temperature on the trunk of the body varies between 33.5 and 36.9 °C (92.3 and 98.4 °F), though the skin's temperature is lower over protruding parts, like the nose, and higher over muscles and active organs. During intense activity, the skin temperature may rise to 37 and 39°C (98.6-102.2℉). Recording skin temperature presents extensive difficulties. Although it is not a clear indicator of internal body temperature, skin temperature is significant in assessing the healthy function of skin. Some experts believe the physiological significance of skin temperature has been overlooked, because clinical analysis has favoured measuring temperatures of the mouth, armpit, and/or rectum. Temperatures of these parts typically are consistent with internal body temperature.

Patterns in skin temperature often provide crucial diagnostic data on pathological conditions, ranging from locomotion to vascular diseases. Such information can prove significant to determination of subsequent therapeutic treatments.

== Background and interactions ==
The three primary functions performed by skin are protection, regulation and sensation. Interactions between skin and temperature occur constantly in relation to each of these functions and often hold considerable medical and physiological significance.

The skin is composed of three main layers—the epidermis, dermis, and hypodermis—and contains a variety of cells, receptors and junctions which enable performance of a multitude of functions. The skin has the capacity to cope under a range of conditions and at various tissue temperatures, whilst simultaneously delivering these functions.

There are three important aspects of the relationship between skin and temperature:

1. Thermal sensations can be detected and communicated from localised sensory regions of the skin.
2. Skin acts as both a medium and means for delivering mechanisms of thermoregulation, including insulation, sweating and control of blood flow.
3. Skin tissue itself is subject to a maintaining function within a range of tissue temperatures (skin temperature), which are the result of several factors including heat loss from subcutaneous tissues via radiation, conduction and vaporisation of water.

Temperature measurement (thermometry) of the skin surface is a job that can be performed by several technologies. Key types of skin-surface thermometers include infrared thermometers and thermistors. The performances of these instruments are both highly valid and reliable, and in essence, are equal for purposes of clinical electrodiagnostic readings. However, thermistors have been found to provide greater responsiveness and sensitivity in readings, whilst the infrared thermometers provide greater convenience in terms of speed and manoeuvrability. In practice, the temperature gauged by thermometry is dependent on specific setup conditions, and as such requires consideration of key variables.

== Factors influencing skin temperature ==
Skin is the largest of the human body's organs, making up approximately 15-16% of total adult body weight. The surface of the organ exhibits significant regional temperature variation and often survives thermal extremities that would prove damaging to internal organs.

Surface skin temperature in humans varies alongside ambient temperature, internal temperature and conditions affecting both the skin and underlying structures. Consequently, a uniform temperature is not typically maintained by skin as a whole, as demonstrated by inconsistencies between different regions of the body even in spite of measurements taken under various external conditions. Lower temperatures are characteristically observed in proximity to superficial veins, relative to superficial arteries, and over protruding body parts including the toes, fingers, ears and nose. Meanwhile, skin surface temperature has been observed to be higher over active organs rather than those at rest, as well as over muscles rather than tendons or bones.

Other notable influences on skin surface temperature include instances of heat stress (in which significant portions of cardiac output are directed to the skin), lowered skinfold thickness (contributes to significantly greater surface temperature variation during exercise) and local thermal control of cutaneous blood vessels (local heating may prompt vasodilation whilst local cooling decreases blood flow to the skin).

== Thermoregulation ==
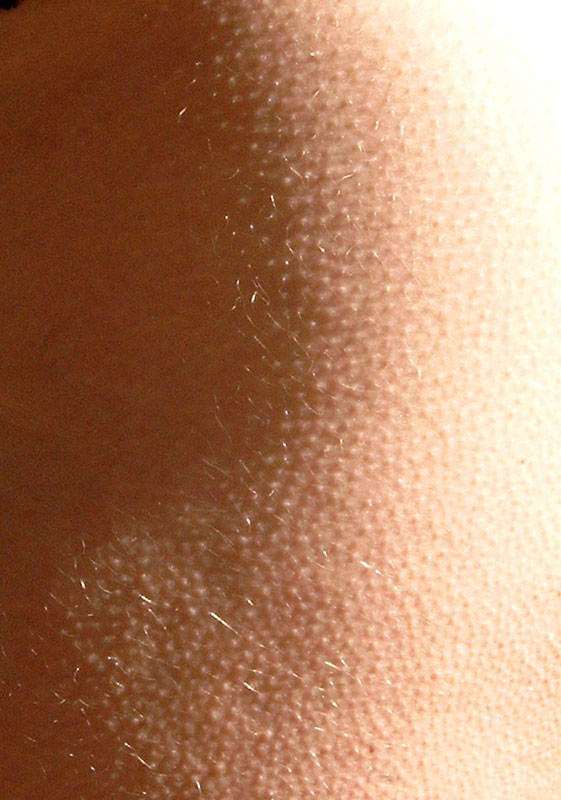
A portion of human skin exhibiting goosebumps.

Skin temperature is a crucial aspect of human physiology and often plays a significant role in affecting thermoregulatory processes. Regulation of skin blood flow is crucial to homeothermy. Sympathetic control of blood flow to the skin involves the system of noradrenergic vasoconstriction as well as an active sympathetic system of vasodilation. In certain cases of hyperthermia, skin vasodilation has permitted blood flow rates of skin to reach volumes of six to eight litres per minute.

Skin contains an array of thermoreceptors, which do not respond to the absolute ambient temperature, but rather to the rate of temperature change, where heat is exchanged between skin and the surrounding environment. The location of these thermoreceptors is not exclusively near to the surface of the skin, some thermoreceptors are instead situated deeper in the organ, located nearer to subcutaneous adipose tissue. This discovery was supported by comparison of changes in deep skin temperature to changes in surface skin temperature. Induced changes to skin temperature in different layers of the skin were pivotal to determining thermoreceptor density and discriminating between these regions.

When experiencing cold conditions, bumps develop around hair follicles (also known as goosebumps or goose pimples). These bumps serve to facilitate the pilo-erection of hairs or "standing on end", essentially perpendicular to the skin surface. The mechanism has provided an evolutionary advantage to fur-bearing animals in insulation of skin temperature, but it is not so helpful in humans who typically have sparse hair coverage over the majority of their skin. The mechanism provides little insulation and thus plays an insignificant role in thermoregulatory processes in homo sapiens.

When ambient temperature is high, cutaneous blood flow is increased (vasodilation), facilitating the transfer of internal body heat to the skin. Evaporation and convection of sweat cause a loss of body heat from the skin surface to the environment, providing an effective means for lowering body temperature. Skin temperature also plays an important role in controlling cooling when exposed to high ambient temperatures. At a given core temperature, higher skin temperature improves the sweat rate, whilst cooler skin temperature inhibits sweat rate.

The preoptic nucleus of the anterior hypothalamus acts as the regulatory centre for the body's heat loss. The hypothalamus sends out nerve impulses, activating the relevant aforementioned mechanisms of vasodilation, vasoconstriction and/or sweating when body temperature is detected above or below the set-point temperature (~37 °C) in the hypothalamus.

== Clinical implications ==
A number of medical conditions affect skin temperature in humans and may prove harmful or fatal to individuals suffering from such conditions when the function of skin is impaired. Additionally, skin temperature has important clinical implications and may also appear as a symptom for a given condition.

=== Cryotherapy ===
Cryotherapy is an established means for treatment of soft tissue injuries, spraining and soreness, where skin is typically cooled at the site of distress. In cases of internal injuries, skin acts as a medium of heat transfer via external application of cryotherapies. Albeit the technique is not grounded in sufficient clinical study, the treatment option is still commonly practised all over the world. Common modalities of cryotherapy often include administration of ice packs or frozen peas to the affected area, or even immersion in ice baths. Between methods of applying frozen gel packs and frozen peas, frozen gel packs have been observed to insufficiently cool skin. Frozen peas, on the other hand, have been observed to produce skin temperatures sufficient to induce localized skin analgesia (a dulling of pain), effectively reducing metabolic enzyme activity and velocity of nervous conduction to clinically stable levels. Beyond injury management, cryotherapy has notable surgical applications (referred to as cryosurgery), in which extremely cool temperatures produced by liquid nitrogen and argon gas are targeted towards malignant tumours in efforts to damage and destroy such tissue. In the skin, external lesions and skin cancers are treated by means of liquid nitrogen, which is applied directly to cancerous cells, effectively reducing the skin temperature in such regions to destructive levels, where cell function can no longer be maintained.

=== Hypothermia (condition & symptom) ===
Hypothermia is defined as having a core body temperature below 35 °C (or 95 °F). Under 35 °C, the body loses more heat than it generates, resulting in fatality in severe cases. Babies suffering from hypothermia will experience low skin temperatures despite appearing healthy otherwise. Heat loss from the skin to the external environment is a significant factor contributing to acute hypothermia. As the barrier between the human body's internal organs and contents, skin undoubtedly plays the pivotal role in heat exchange between the body's internals and the external environment. Internal body heat is released to the environment at a greater rate with low skin temperature, as heat follows temperature gradients from regions of high temperature (the body's internals) to another location of lower temperature, as described by the second law of thermodynamics.

==== Therapeutic hypothermia ====
Hypothermia also has a significant therapeutic role, the technique of therapeutic hypothermia involves deliberate reduction of body temperature to a level around 32° - 34 °C (89.6° – 93.2 °F). The technique has applications in patients suffering from cardiac arrest who remain unconscious following return of spontaneous circulation. Induced mild hypothermia, between temperatures of 33 °C and 36 °C is effective whilst safer than moderate hypothermia, reducing body temperature to the range between 28 °C and 32 °C. The latter temperature range brings with it risks of arrhythmias, ventricular fibrillation as well as possible risks of coagulopathy and infection.

Furthermore, the timing of hypothermia treatments are a crucial consideration to be made when dealing with patients suffering from cardiac arrest. Mild hypothermia ought to begin directly following resuscitation of the patient for maximum effectiveness, though there is some evidence of the treatment proving effective hours after cardiac arrest in animal models.

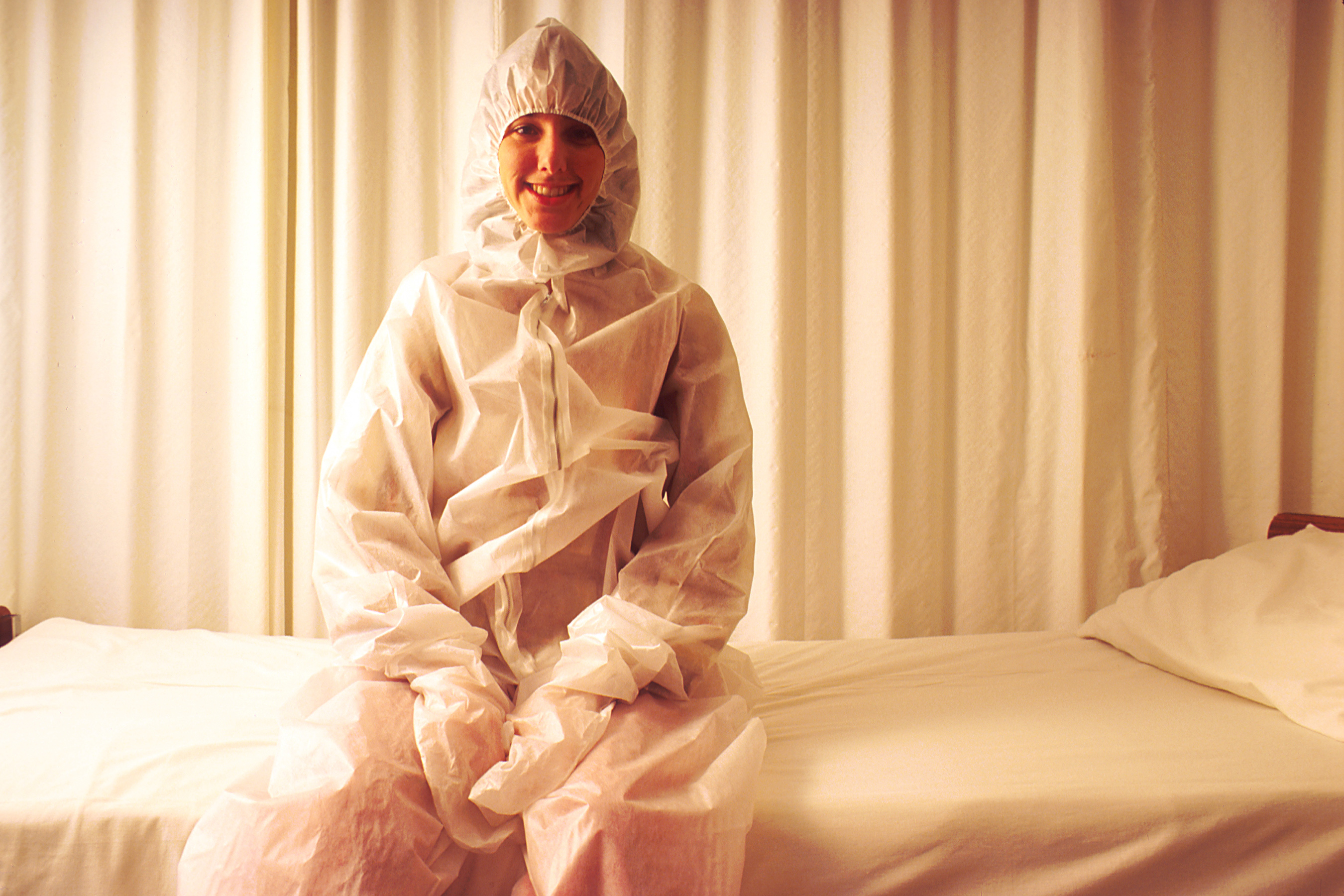
A patient receiving therapeutic hyperthermia as a treatment option against advanced cancer.

=== Hyperthermia (condition & symptom) ===
Hyperthermia is defined as the condition where an individual's body temperature is elevated beyond normal parameters as a result of the failure of thermoregulatory processes. Hyperthermia is a common symptom of conditions such as heat stroke, where it manifests as hot, dry skin or heavy perspiration. Heat stroke itself can be devastating. Irreversible long term brain injury occurs in around one in five people affected by the condition.

==== Therapeutic hyperthermia ====
In the field of oncology, ‘hyperthermia’ refers to treatment of malignant diseases by administration of heat to the body to a given location. Hyperthermia is often applied in combination with established treatment modalities for tumor treatment. Temperatures above 40 °C are often favourable conditions for receptiveness to chemotherapy and radiotherapy.

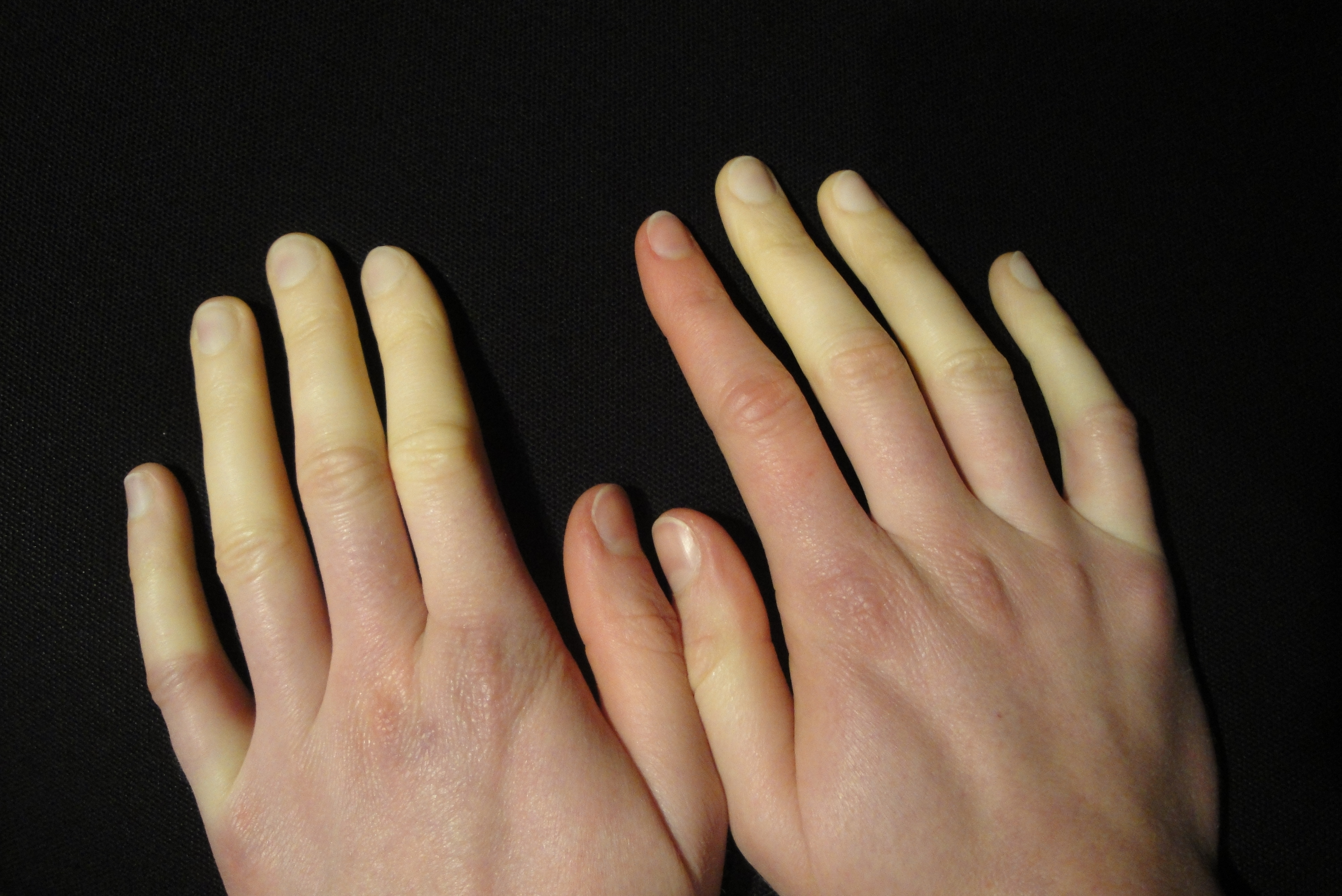
Discoloured pale fingers associated with abnormally low skin temperature, resulting from Raynaud's.

=== Raynaud’s phenomenon ===
Raynaud's phenomenon (also known as Raynaud's disease or syndrome) is an important condition affecting skin temperature of many around the globe. Raynaud's phenomenon is the exaggerated response of cutaneous circulation to exposure to cold ambient temperatures. ‘Raynaud attacks’, which can begin in parts of the body and spread, effectively lowering skin temperature to dangerous levels in short periods. The consequences of these attacks can be severe, potentially causing Gangrene, a destructive implication of abnormal skin temperature.

=== Other clinical implications ===
Impaired vasodilation of cutaneous blood vessels may occur as part of type 2 diabetes. Where ambient temperatures are high, impaired cutaneous vascular control often involves consequences including incidents of heat exhaustion and heat stroke due to heat transfer. Such implications arise from heat transfer, from the environment to the skin, causing skin temperature to increase. Subsequently, the blood travelling through the dilated skin vessels is heated during circulation. Delivery of the heat to subcutaneous regions of the body is facilitated by the body's impaired vasodilation.

Skin temperature may also be an indicator of the presence of cancer. Widespread methods for detection of cancer involve identification of non-neuronal thermoregulation of blood perfusion as well as periodic alterations to, or aberrant oscillations in, the spatial homogeneity of skin temperature. This is because sites of tumour growth are often associated with increased immune response causing inflammation, which effectively increases skin temperature, departing from the spatial homogeneity of skin temperature in the breasts. In screening for breast cancer, measurement of skin temperature (particularly instances of hyperthermia) hold great significance. Accordingly, fluctuations in skin temperature over large portions of the breasts are often investigated in hopes of revealing sites of tumour growth. In thermography, the skin temperature of each breast is monitored utilising techniques such as infrared imaging and liquid crystal contact thermography (LCCT).
