= Morton's neuroma =

Benign neuroma of an intermetatarsal plantar nerve

- Other names: Morton neuroma, Morton's metatarsalgia, Intermetatarsal neuroma, Intermetatarsal space neuroma common plantar digital compressive neuropathy
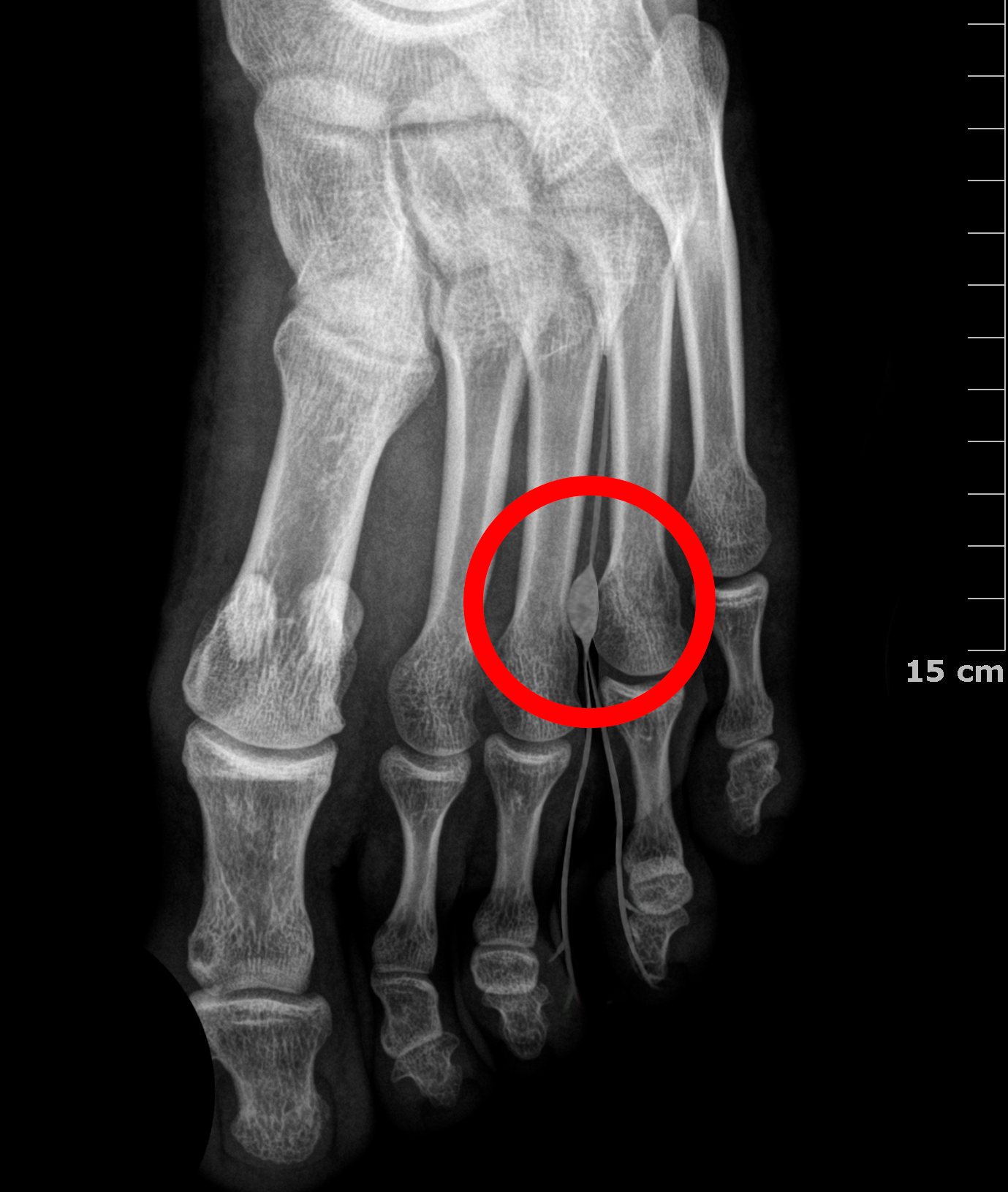
- Foot Xray with a drawing of Morton's neuroma added
- Specialty: Orthopedics

Morton's neuroma is a benign neuroma of an intermetatarsal plantar nerve, most commonly of the second and third intermetatarsal spaces (between the second/third and third/fourth metatarsal heads; the first is of the big toe), which results in the entrapment of the affected nerve. The main symptoms are pain and/or numbness, sometimes relieved by discontinuance of wearing footwear with tight toe boxes and/or high heels (which have been linked to the condition). The condition is named after Thomas George Morton, though it was first correctly described by a chiropodist named Durlacher.

Some sources claim that entrapment of the plantar nerve resulting from compression between the metatarsal heads, as originally proposed by Morton, is highly unlikely, because the plantar nerve is on the plantar side of the transverse metatarsal ligament and thus does not come into contact with the metatarsal heads. It is more likely that the transverse metatarsal ligament is the cause of the entrapment.

Though the condition is labeled as a neuroma, many sources do not consider it a true tumor, but rather a perineural fibroma (fibrous tissue formation around nerve tissue).

== Signs and symptoms ==
Symptoms include pain on weight bearing, frequently after only a short time. The nature of the pain varies widely among individuals. Some people experience shooting pain affecting the contiguous halves of two toes. Others describe a feeling akin to having a pebble in the shoe or walking on razor blades. Burning, numbness, and paresthesia may also be experienced. The symptoms progress over time, often beginning as a tingling sensation in the ball of the foot.

Morton's neuroma lesions have been found using MRI in patients without symptoms.

== Diagnosis ==
Negative signs include a lack of obvious deformities, erythema, signs of inflammation, or limitation of movement. Direct pressure between the metatarsal heads will replicate the symptoms, as will compression of the forefoot between the finger and thumb so as to compress the transverse arch of the foot. This is referred to as Mulder's sign.

There are other causes of pain in the forefoot that often lead to miscategorization as neuroma, such as capsulitis, which is an inflammation of ligaments that surround two bones at the level of the joint. If the ligaments that attach the phalanx (bone of the toe) to the metatarsal bone are impacted, the resulting inflammation may put pressure on an otherwise healthy nerve and produce neuroma-type symptoms. Additionally, an intermetatarsal bursitis between the third and fourth metatarsal bones will also give neuroma-type symptoms because it too puts pressure on the nerve. Freiberg disease, which is an osteochondritis of the metatarsal head, causes pain on weight-bearing or compression. Other conditions that could be clinically confused with a neuroma include stress fractures/reactions and plantar plate disruption.

=== Histopathology ===
Microscopically, the affected nerve is markedly distorted, with extensive concentric perineural fibrosis. The arterioles are thickened and occlusion by thrombi are occasionally present.

=== Imaging ===
Though a neuroma is a soft-tissue abnormality and will not be visualized by standard radiographs, the first step in the assessment of forefoot pain is an X-ray to detect the presence of arthritis and exclude stress fractures/reactions and focal bone lesions, which may mimic the symptoms of a neuroma. Ultrasound (sonography) accurately demonstrates thickening of the interdigital nerve within the web space of greater than 3mm, diagnostic of a Morton's neuroma. This typically occurs at the level of the intermetatarsal ligament. Frequently, intermetatarsal bursitis coexists with the diagnosis. MRI can distinguish conditions that mimic the symptoms of Morton's neuroma, but when more than one abnormality exists, ultrasound has the added advantage of determining the precise source of the patient's pain by applying direct pressure with the probe. Ultrasound may also be used to guide treatment such as cortisone injections into the webspace, as well as alcohol ablation of the nerve.

== Treatment ==
=== Conservative ===
Orthotics and improved footwear are the first-line treatments for Morton's neuroma. In addition to traditional orthotic arch supports, a small foam or fabric pad may be positioned under the space between the two affected metatarsals, immediately behind the bone ends. This pad helps to splay the metatarsal bones and create more space for the nerve so as to relieve pressure and irritation. However, it may also elicit mild uncomfortable sensations of its own, such as the feeling of having an awkward object under one's foot. Footwear and orthotics are most effective in neuromas that have existed less than four and a half months and are smaller than 4–5 millimetres (0.16–0.20 in). To prevent or treat Morton's neuroma, comfortable shoes that are sufficiently long and have a wide toe box, flat heel, and thick sole are recommended.

Corticosteroid injections can relieve inflammation in some patients and help end the symptoms. For some patients, however, the inflammation and pain recur after some weeks or months, and corticosteroids may only be used a limited number of times because they cause progressive degeneration of ligamentous and tendinous tissues. About 30% of people who receive steroid injections go on to have surgery. According to a 2021 review, it is most effective in neuromas smaller than 6.3 millimetres (0.25 in).

Sclerosing alcohol injections are an increasingly available treatment alternative if other management approaches fail. Dilute alcohol (4%) is injected directly into the area of the neuroma, causing toxicity to the fibrous nerve tissue. Frequently, treatment must be performed two to four times, with one to three weeks between interventions. A 60–80% success rate has been achieved in clinical studies, equal to or exceeding the success rate for surgical neurectomy, with fewer risks and less significant recovery. If done with more concentrated alcohol under ultrasound guidance, the success rate is considerably higher and fewer repeat procedures are needed.

Radiofrequency ablation is also used in the treatment of Morton's neuroma. The outcomes appear to be similar to, or even more reliable than, alcohol injections, especially if the procedure is performed under ultrasound guidance.

A 2019 systematic review of randomised controlled trials found that corticosteroid injections or manipulation/mobilisation reduced pain more than control, extracorporeal shockwave therapy or varus/valgus foot wedges (which did not reduce pain more than control or comparison treatment, and pain reduction was not reported in any wider foot/metatarsal padding studies). The review also found no randomised controlled trials for sclerosing alcohol injections, radiofrequency ablation, cryoneurolysis or botulinum toxin injections; these were only assessed with pre-test/post-test case series, which do not measure the benefit of treatment beyond placebo or spontaneous improvement over time.

=== Surgery ===
If non-surgical interventions fail, patients are commonly offered neurectomy, a surgery that involves removing the affected piece of nerve tissue. Postoperative scar tissue formation (known as stump neuroma) can occur in approximately 20–30% of cases, causing a return of neuroma symptoms. Neurectomy may be performed using one of two general methods. Making the incision from the dorsal side (the top of the foot) is the more common method but requires cutting the deep transverse metatarsal ligament that connects the third and fourth metatarsals in order to access the nerve beneath it. This results in exaggerated postoperative splaying of the third and fourth digits (toes) resulting from the loss of the supporting ligamentous structure. This has aesthetic concerns for some patients and possible, though unquantified, long-term implications for foot structure and health. Alternatively, making the incision from the ventral side (the sole of the foot) allows more direct access to the affected nerve without cutting other structures. However, this approach requires a greater post-operative recovery time in which the patient must avoid weight-bearing on the affected foot, because the ventral aspect of the foot is more highly enervated and impacted by pressure when standing. It also carries an increased risk of scar-tissue formation in a location that causes ongoing pain. However 95% of the patients after a decade didn`t regret having the surgery and felt a reduction in pain.

When a patient has multiple neuromas in the same foot, the most common surgical approach is to remove them all using a single incision.

Cryogenic neuroablation (also known as cryoinjection therapy, cryoneurolysis, cryosurgery or cryoablation) is a lesser-known alternative to neurectomy surgery. It involves the destruction of axons to prevent them from carrying painful impulses. This is accomplished by making a small incision (~3 mm) and inserting a cryoneedle that applies extremely low temperatures of between −50 °C to −70 °C to the nerve/neuroma, resulting in degeneration of the intracellular elements, axons and myelin sheath (which houses the neuroma) with wallerian degeneration. The epineurium and perineurium remain intact, thus preventing the formation of stump neuroma. The preservation of these structures differentiates cryogenic neuroablation from surgical excision and neurolytic agents such as alcohol. An initial study showed that cryoneuroablation is initially equal in effectiveness to surgery but does not have the risk of stump neuroma formation.

An increasing range of procedures are being performed at specialist centers to treat Morton's neuroma under ultrasound guidance. Studies have examined the treatment of the condition with ultrasound-guided sclerosing alcohol injections, radiofrequency ablation and cryoablation.
