= ACL-RSI scale =

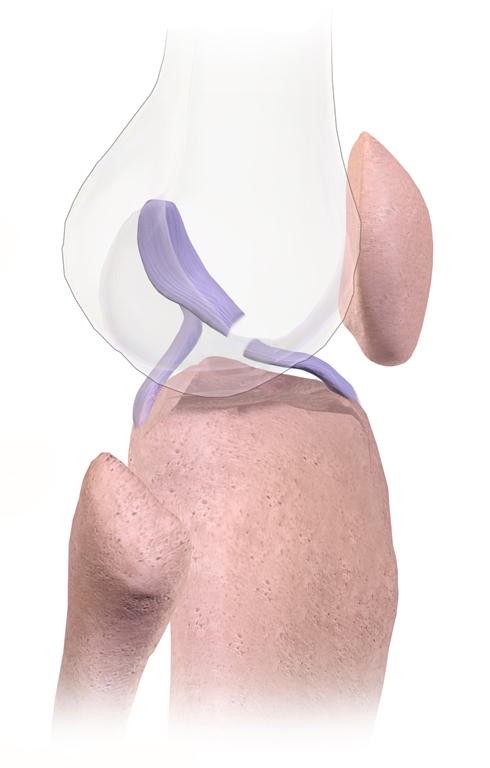
Tear in the center of the ACL

Anterior Cruciate Ligament - Return to Sport after Injury (ACL-RSI) is a 12-item self-report questionnaire that measures the psychological readiness of an athlete to return to sport (RTS) after an ACL injury. The scale was developed by Kate E Webster, Julian A Feller, and Christina Lambros in 2008. The scale measures psychological readiness by evaluating emotions, confidence, and risk-appraisal of an athlete recovering from an ACL injury and looking to return to their sport. The ACL-RSI evaluates multiple dimensions of psychological readiness, such as emotions, confidence, and risk-appraisal, of an athlete recovering from an ACL injury and looking to return to their sport.

== Background ==
An ACL injury is a tear or sprain of the anterior cruciate ligament, one of four major ligaments in the knee. Its purpose is to keep the knee joint stable as it crosses in the middle of the knee, connecting the femur to the tibia. ACL injuries occur when the femur and tibia move in the opposite direction under full body weight. The most common location for a tear is in the center of the ACL, however it can also be torn from the femur or the tibia. The ACL is commonly injured when trying to quickly stop movement to change direction, getting hit on the side of the knees, or overextending the joint.

A tear or rupture of the ligament cannot regrow or heal on its own. The only way to treat an ACL injury is through surgery, however, not everyone needs a surgery. In some cases, the ACL can create a scar that bridges the gap between the torn ligament, which restores knee stability. Patients who do not require intense physical labor or athletics may be able to continue with daily activity without surgery. Athletes or other patients who wish to perform in physically demanding activity often need ACL reconstruction surgery. Physical therapy starts immediately after the reconstruction surgery. The timeline for complete recovery varies from patient to patient, but commonly ranges from 6 to 9 months of rehabilitation, and sometimes 12 months until RTS.

Return to sport is the transition phase of an injured athlete incorporating sport-specific movements to begin play under the supervision of physical therapists. Jumping straight into sports after physical therapy increases risks of re-injury. A typical RTS test includes strength testing of the quadriceps and hamstrings, force plate analysis of jumping tasks, hop tasks, assessment of landing and cutting techniques, assessment of sport-specific movements, and psychological readiness screening.

== Purpose ==
Past studies show that kinesephobia, or fear of re-injury, is one of the biggest limitations for an athlete to return to sports at the same level as pre-injury. Lower psychological readiness has been associated with lower rate of RTS and a prolongation of the time for RTS. The ACL-RSI scores can show how much an athlete has improved psychologically from pre-operative stage to RTS phase. The "slope" of the score is important in determining the improvement in psychological readiness. The scale gives the clinician an idea of how likely an athlete is to return to sports after recovery from ACL injury. Those who score lower on the scale at 6 months and 12 months are less likely to return to play at the same level as pre-injury competitive level. If the patient does not feel confident in their knee, they may attempt to protect their knee during play, leading to poor technique and increasing risk of re-injury. Once the clinician has a better idea of the athlete's psychological state, they may choose to delay RTS or include more psychological intervention strategies.

== Details ==
The ACL-RSI evaluates three psychological responses associated with return to sports: emotions, confidence, and risk appraisal. Patients respond on a scale of 0 (not confident at all) to 100 (fully confident) in increments of 10.

=== Emotion ===
Fear of re-injury, frustration, nervousness, and tension are commonly reported emotions experienced by injured athletes. Five questions were developed to measure these common emotions. One of the questions evaluate how nervous an athlete feels about playing their sport. Another evaluates frustration in having to consider their knee during play. Two questions evaluate fear of re-injury during play. Lastly, one evaluates how relaxed an athlete feels about playing.

=== Confidence ===
An athlete's confidence in their knee is also important to evaluate their psychological readiness. In total five questions were developed to measure confidence in knee function and confidence in performance. Three questions evaluate the confidence in knee function: one in knee not giving away during play, another in it being able to handle pressure, and lastly being able to play without thinking about the knee. Two questions evaluated the confidence in the athlete's performance in their sport and being able to return to previous level of participation.

=== Risk Appraisal ===
Another important factor in RTS phase is determining the athlete's evaluation of the likelihood to re-injure themselves. A question asks if the athlete feels that they may re-injure their knee during play. A second question to determine risk-appraisal asks if the thought of re-experiencing surgery and rehabilitation prevents them from playing.

== Limitations ==
The ACL-RSI is specific to athletes who want to return to sports after an ACL injury. It cannot be applied to athletes with different injuries or those who do not wish to return to sports. It also does not give a definitive answer of if an athlete will return to sports or not. It cannot replace physical testing, such as quadriceps strength testing, hop testing, and functional symmetry.

== Other Versions ==
Researchers developed a short version of the ACL-RSI scale that benefit busy clinics since the long version can be challenging to complete with a high volume of patients. The short version still includes questions regarding emotion, confidence, and risk appraisal. Instead of five questions, only two questions about confidence are included in the short version: one for knee function and another for performance. For emotions, there are three questions in total: one for nervousness, one for frustration, and one for fear of re-injury. Only one question about likeliness of reinjury was included for risk-appraisal. Despite its condensed version, reliability and validity of the scale remained similar to the full version.

The ACL-RSI has been translated and culturally adapted in different countries to allow for a better evaluation for athletes across the world. Currently there are difference versions in Italian, Arabic, Chinese, French, Danish, Dutch, Lithuanian, Swedish, German, Turkish, Brazilian Portuguese, Spanish, and Persian.

Testing psychological readiness is important in non-athletes and athletes with different injuries. Tampa Scale for Kinesiophia (TSK) measures the fear of movement or re-injury for patients of different athletic levels, injuries, and ages. Oftentimes after an injury, patients avoid movement in certain ways if they have high kinesiophobia to reduce their risk of re-injury. Kinesiophobia has been associated being overweight and obese BMI value, having moderate to severe pain, physical inactivity, anxiety, and depression. Multidimensional Health Locus of Control (MHLC) measures the Internal Health Locus of Control (IHLC), or the extent to which people believe their health status is a result of their own actions, Powerful Others Health Locus of Control (PHLC), or the belief that their health is determined by health professionals or family members, and Chance Health Locus of Control (CHLC), or the belief that their health is determined by luck or random fate. The scores can show if the patient is likely to have proactive health behaviors and comply with health professionals. This helps guide communication and treatment strategies as clinicians gain a better understanding of patient's compliance levels. Injury-Psychological Readiness to Return to Sport (I-PRRS) has a similar purpose as ACL-RSI but is inclusive of all injuries athletes experience. A high I-PRRS score indicates higher psychological readiness for RTS. Other scales designed specifically for RTS for different injuries have been developed as well. Superior-Labrum Anterior-Posterior Return to Sport Index (SLAP-RSI) and Shoulder Instability Return to Sport after Injury (SIRSI) focus on injuries related to shoulders for athletes. Each scale developed captures a different dimension of psychological readiness and are best used together.
