= Anterior cruciate ligament injury =

Ligament injury near the knee

Anterior Cruciate Ligament injury
- Diagram of the right knee
- Specialty: Orthopedics
- Symptoms: Audible "crack" with pain, knee instability, swelling of knee
- Causes: Non-contact injury, contact injury
- Risk factors: Athletes, females
- Diagnostic method: Physical exam, MRI
- Prevention: Neuromuscular training, core strengthening
- Treatment: Braces, physical therapy, surgery
- Frequency: c. 200,000 per year (US)

An anterior cruciate ligament injury occurs when the anterior cruciate ligament (ACL) is either stretched, partially torn, or completely torn. The most common injury is a complete tear. Symptoms include pain, an audible cracking sound during injury, pivoting (slipping) of the knee when foot is planted, and the upper body twists, and knee effusion. The effusion generally appears within a couple of hours. In approximately 50% of cases, other structures of the knee such as surrounding ligaments, cartilage, or meniscus are damaged.

The underlying mechanism often involves a rapid change in direction, sudden stop, landing after a jump, or direct contact to the knee. It is more common in athletes, particularly those who participate in alpine skiing, football (soccer), netball, American football, or basketball. Diagnosis is typically made by physical examination and is sometimes supported and confirmed by magnetic resonance imaging (MRI). Physical examination will often show tenderness around the knee joint, reduced range of motion of the knee, and increased looseness of the joint.

Attempts at prevention have focused on neuromuscular training and core strengthening. Treatment recommendations depend on desired level of participation in activities that involve pivoting of the knee. In those with low levels of future pivoting activity, surgery may have few benefits. For all types of ACL ruptures, symptoms may be limited by bracing during pivoting activities and strengthening of the muscles around the knee. Arthroscopic anterior cruciate ligament reconstruction is offered to people who want to return to sports or activities that involve frequent pivoting such as basketball or soccer. This involves replacement of the ligament with a tendon taken from another area of the body or from a cadaver. Following surgery, rehabilitation involves stretching and strengthening the muscles around the knee. Surgery, if chosen, is generally not performed until the initial inflammation from the injury has resolved. It should also be taken into precaution to build up as much strength in the muscle that the tendon is being taken from to reduce risk of injury.

About 200,000 people are affected per year in the United States. In some sports, women have a higher risk of ACL injury, while in others, both sexes are equally affected. While adults with a complete tear have a higher rate of later knee osteoarthritis, treatment strategy does not appear to change this risk. ACL tears can also occur in some animals, including dogs.

== Signs and symptoms ==
When an individual has an ACL injury, they are likely to hear a "pop" in their knee followed by pain and swelling. Specifcally, the knee joint fills with blood. They may also experience a specific type of instability in the knee called a "pivot shift" once they resume walking and other activities. Pivot shift occurs because in a knee without an ACL, the tibia slides forward on the lateral side. The reduction that occurs with knee flexion is the pivot shift.

The blood in the joint makes knee movement painful and the capsule thickens and contracts, reducing range of motion (stiffness). The pain, effusion, and stiffness resolve with time and exercises, but the pivot shift remains.

== Causes ==
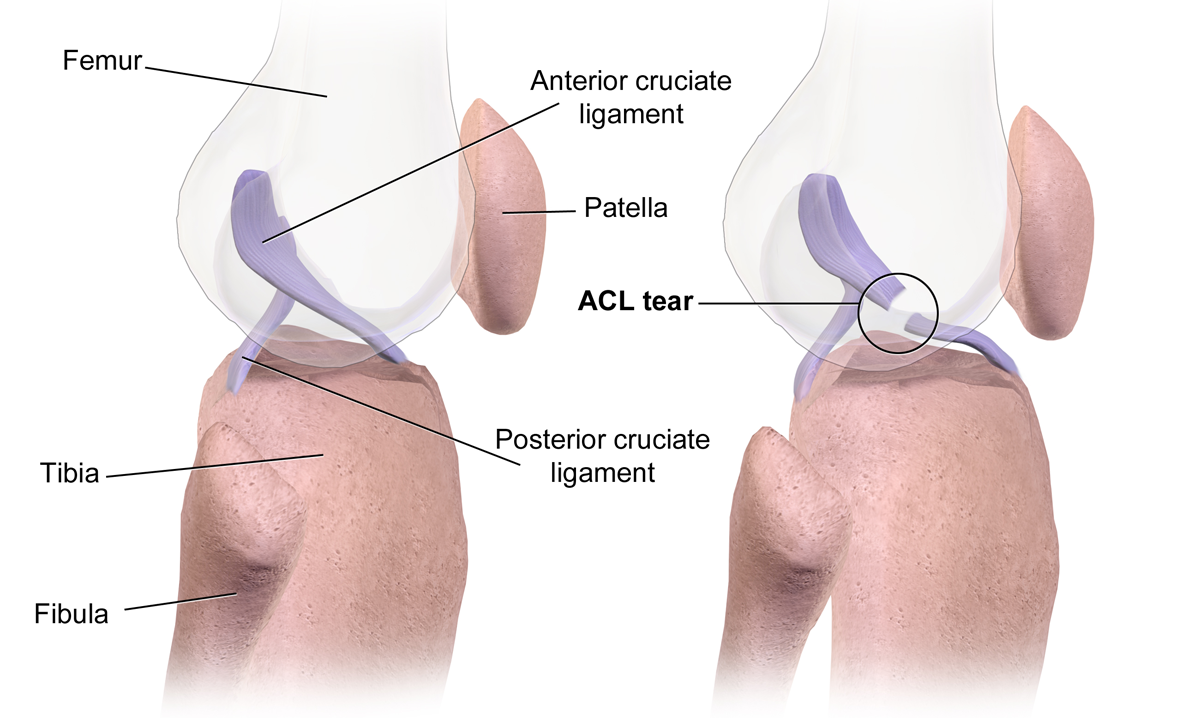
ACL tear

Tearing occurs when the tibia moves too far forwards or the femur moves too far backwards. Causes may include:

- Changing direction rapidly (also known as "cutting")
- Landing from a jump awkwardly
- Coming to a sudden stop when running
- A direct contact or collision to the knee (e.g. during a football tackle or a motor vehicle collision)

These movements cause the tibia to shift away from the femur rapidly, placing strain on the knee joint and potentially leading to rupture of the ACL. About 80% of ACL injuries occur without direct trauma. Risk factors include female anatomy, specific sports, poor conditioning, fatigue, and playing on a turf field.

Injuries to the ACL are common, 250,000 ACL injuries occur on an annual basis. This corresponds to a 1 in 3,000 chance of an individual sustaining an ACL injury. Ligaments in the ACL or meniscus are usually torn with an external force being applied to the knee joint. The ACL can be torn without an external force being applied

=== Female predominance ===
Female athletes are two to eight times more likely to rupture their ACL in sports that involve cutting and jumping as compared to men who play the same particular sports. NCAA data has found relative rates of injury per 1000 athlete exposures as follows:

- Men's basketball 0.07, women's basketball 0.23
- Men's lacrosse 0.12, women's lacrosse 0.17
- Men's football 0.09, women's football 0.28

The highest rate of ACL injury in women occurred in gymnastics, with a rate of injury per 1000 athlete exposures of 0.33. Of the four sports with the highest ACL injury rates, three were women's – gymnastics, basketball and soccer.

Differences between males and females identified as potential causes are the active muscular protection of the knee joint, differences in leg/pelvis alignment, and relative ligament laxity caused by differences in hormonal activity from estrogen and relaxin. Limited and low-quality evidence suggests that birth control pills may decrease the risk of ACL injury.

==== Dominance theories ====
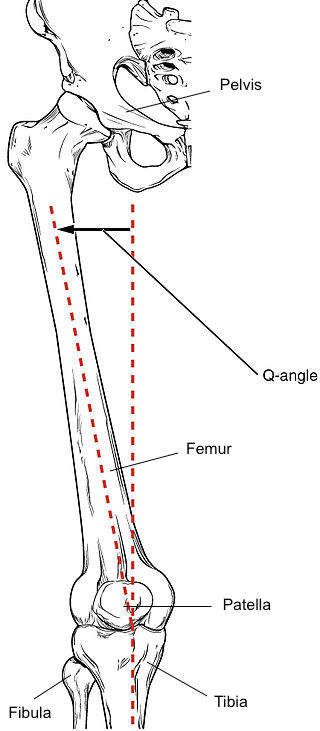
Femur with Q angle: the angle formed by a line drawn from the anterior superior iliac spine through the center of the patella and a line drawn from the center of the patella to the center of the tibial tubercle

Some studies have suggested that there are four neuromuscular imbalances that predispose women to higher incidence of ACL injury. Female athletes are more likely to jump and land with their knees relatively straight and collapsing in towards each other, while most of their bodyweight falls on a single foot and their upper body tilts to one side. Several theories have been described to further explain these imbalances. These include the ligament dominance, quadriceps dominance, leg dominance, and trunk dominance theories.

The ligament dominance theory suggests that when females athletes land after a jump, their muscles do not sufficiently absorb the impact of the ground. As a result, the ligaments of the knee must absorb the force, leading to a higher risk of injury. Quadriceps dominance refers to a tendency of female athletes to preferentially use the quadriceps muscles to stabilize the knee joint. Given that the quadriceps muscles work to pull the tibia forward, an overpowering contraction of the quadriceps can place strain on the ACL, increasing risk of injury.

Leg dominance describes the observation that women tend to place more weight on one leg than another. Finally, trunk dominance suggests that males typically exhibit greater control of the trunk in performance situations as evidenced by greater activation of the internal oblique muscle. Female athletes are more likely to land with their upper body tilted to one side and more weight on one leg than the other, therefore placing greater rotational force on their knees.

Governments and healthcare professionals acknowledge the high incidence of ACL injuries and have dedicated significant research efforts to prevention and rehabilitation. Studies have demonstrated the effectiveness of diverse training methods, such as balance, plyometric, resistance, and technique training, in reducing ACL injury risk among adolescent females. However, evidence supporting this approach for adult sport-active populations, both male and female, is limited. Two underdeveloped areas are the specificity of exercises used in interventions and the consideration of athletes' experiences, including adherence and motivation. Therefore, there is a need for injury prevention researchers to optimize training content and delivery methods to better translate research findings for diverse sport populations of varying ages and genders.

==== Hormonal and anatomic differences ====
Before puberty, there is no observed difference in frequency of ACL tears between the sexes. Changes in sex hormone levels, specifically elevated levels of estrogen and relaxin in females during the menstrual cycle, have been hypothesized as causing predisposition of ACL ruptures. This is because they may increase joint laxity and extensibility of the soft tissues surrounding the knee joint. Ongoing research has observed a greater occurrence of ACL injuries in females during ovulation and fewer injuries during the follicular and luteal phases of the menstrual cycle.

Study results have shown that female collegiate athletes with concentration levels of relaxin that are greater than 6.0 pg/mL are at four times higher risk of an ACL tear than those with lower concentrations.

Relaxin is increased when estrogen levels are increased during the female menstrual cycle. Estrogen is at its peak just before ovulation, which makes it fall into the follicular phase of the menstrual cycle. These hormonal rises often fall within a 2-3 day period of an increase in knee laxity. These times of increased estrogen concentration are subsequently related to times of reduced tendon strength and stability. Additionally, the use of hormonal medication such as birth control may fluctuate the window and level of laxity which should be monitored. The NHI, found that the use of hormonal oral contraceptives reduced the risk of tearing by 68%. Moreover, women are more likely to face an ACL tear or injury when they are experiencing elevated levels of estrogen or progesterone. During these times, females don't necessarily need to limit their activity levels out of fear or precaution but it is beneficial if they participate in the proper warm-ups or strengthening exercises to limit potential risks.

Additionally, female pelvises widen during puberty through the influence of sex hormones. This wider pelvis requires the femur to angle toward the knees. This angle towards the knee is referred to as the Q angle. The average Q angle for men is 14 degrees and the average for women is 17 degrees. Steps can be taken to reduce this Q angle, such as using orthotics. The relatively wider female hip and widened Q angle may lead to an increased likelihood of ACL tears in women.

==== ACL, muscular stiffness, and strength ====
During puberty, sex hormones also affect the remodeled shape of soft tissues throughout the body. The tissue remodeling results in female ACLs that are smaller and will fail (i.e. tear) at lower loading forces, and differences in ligament and muscular stiffness between men and women. Women's knees are less stiff than men's during muscle activation. Force applied to a less stiff knee is more likely to result in tears.

In addition, the quadriceps femoris muscle is an antagonist to the ACL. According to a study undertaken on female athletes at the University of Michigan, 31% of female athletes recruited the quadriceps femoris muscle first as compared to 17% in males. Because of the elevated contraction of the quadriceps femoris muscle during physical activity, an increased strain is placed onto the ACL due to the "tibial translation anteriorly".

== Pathophysiology ==
The knee joint is formed by three bones: the femur (thighbone), the tibia (shinbone), and the patella (kneecap). These bones are held together by ligaments, which are strong bands of tissue that keep the joint stable while an individual is walking, running, jumping, etc. There are two types of ligaments in the knee: the collateral ligaments and the cruciate ligaments.

The collateral ligaments include the medial collateral ligament (along the inside of the knee) and the lateral or fibular collateral ligament (along the outside of the knee). These two ligaments function to limit sideways movement of the knee.

The cruciate ligaments form an "X" inside the knee joint with the anterior cruciate ligament running from the front of the tibia to the back of the femur, and the posterior cruciate ligament running from the back of the tibia to the front of the femur. The anterior cruciate ligament prevents the tibia from sliding out in front of the femur and provides rotational stability.

There are also two C-shaped structures made of cartilage called the medial meniscus and lateral meniscus that sit on top of the tibia in the knee joint and serve as cushion for the bones.

Right knee, front, showing interior ligaments	Left knee, behind, showing interior ligaments

== Diagnosis ==
=== Manual tests ===
Most ACL injuries can be diagnosed by examining the knee and comparing it to the other, non-injured knee. When a doctor suspects ACL injury in a person who reports a popping sound in the knee followed by swelling, pain, and instability of the knee joint, they can perform several tests to evaluate the damage to the knee. These tests include the pivot-shift test, anterior drawer test, and Lachman test. The pivot-shift test involves flexing the knee while holding onto the ankle and slightly rotating the tibia inwards. In the anterior drawer test, the examiner flexes the knees to 90 degrees, sits on the person's feet, and gently pulls the tibia towards themself. The Lachman test is performed by placing one hand on the person's thigh and the other on the tibia and pulling the tibia forward. These tests are meant to test whether the ACL is intact and therefore able to limit the forward motion of the tibia. The Lachman test is recognized by most authorities as the most reliable and sensitive of the three.

Advances in motion capture, musculoskeletal modeling, and human simulation have improved understanding of the mechanical causes of musculoskeletal injuries and diseases. However, measuring force at joint, muscle, tendon, and articular surfaces, especially in the knee, relies heavily on intricate modeling of motion capture and medical imaging data. This has limited involvement of biomechanists in designing, implementing, and evaluating prophylactic training interventions and neuromuscular rehabilitation programs.

=== Medical imaging ===
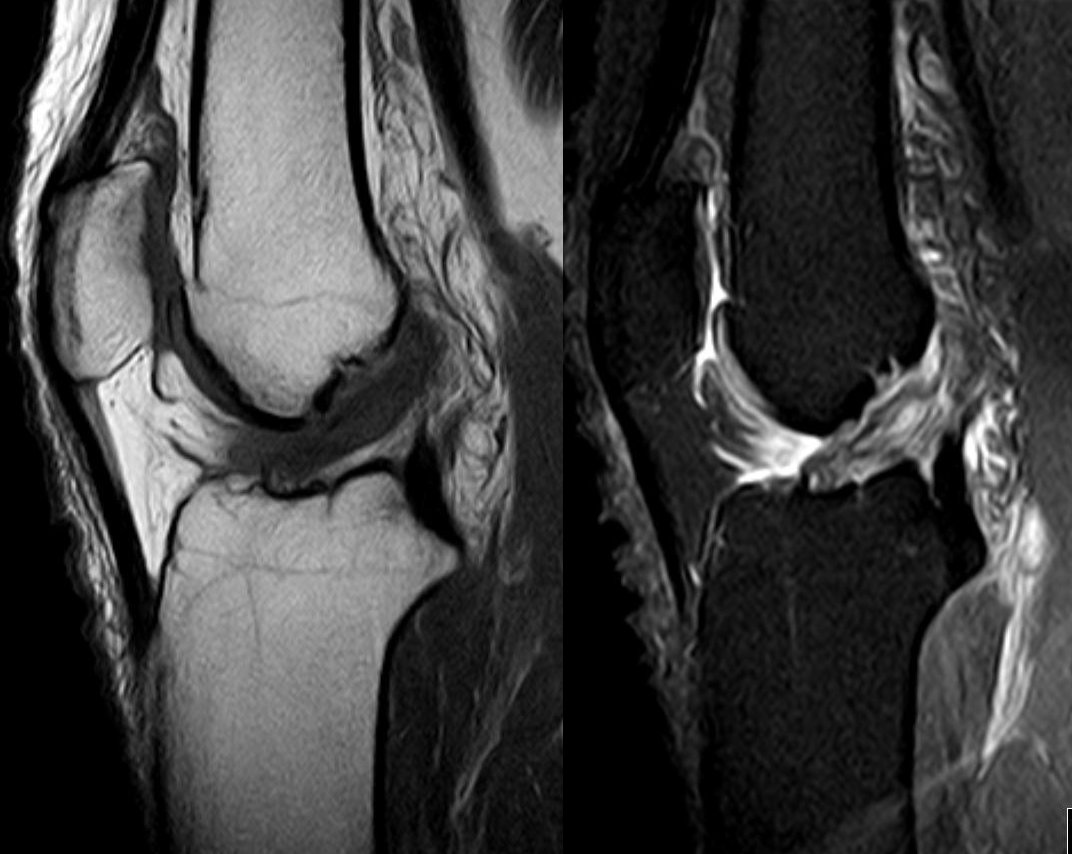
Anterior cruciate ligament tear seen on MRI. T1 left, right PDW.

Though clinical examination in experienced hands can be accurate, the diagnosis is usually confirmed by magnetic resonance imaging, which provides images of the soft tissues like ligaments and cartilage around the knee. It may also permit visualization of other structures which may have been coincidentally involved, such as the menisci or collateral ligaments. An x-ray may be performed in addition to evaluate whether one of the bones in the knee joint was broken during the injury.

MRI is the most used technique for diagnosing the state of the ACL, but it is not always the most reliable technique as the ACL can seem healed on chronic cases with the proliferation of synovial scar tissue when treated conservatively.

MRI is particularly useful in cases of partial tear of the ACL. The anteromedial band is most commonly injured compared to the posterolateral band.

=== Arthrometers/Laximeters ===
Another form of evaluation that may be used in case physical examination and MRI are inconclusive is laximetry testing (i.e. arthrometry and stress imaging), which involve applying a force to the leg and quantifying the resulting displacement of the knee. These medical devices basically replicate manual tests but offer objective assessments. The GNRB arthrometer, for example, is a knee arthrometer that is considered more effective than the Lachman test.

=== Classification ===
An injury to a ligament is called a sprain. The American Academy of Orthopedic Surgeons defines ACL injury in terms of severity and classifies them as Grade 1, 2, or 3 sprains. Grade 1 sprains occur when the ligament is stretched slightly but the stability of the knee joint is not affected. Grade 2 sprains occur when the ligament is stretched to the point that it becomes loose; this is also referred to as a partial tear. Grade 3 sprains occur when the ligament is completely torn into two pieces. The pivot shift only occurs after a complete rupture. Complete rupture is the most common type of ACL injury.

Around half of ACL injuries occur in conjunction with injury to other structures in the knee, including the other ligaments, menisci, or cartilage on the surface of the bones. A specific pattern of injury called the "unhappy triad" (also known as the "terrible triad," or "O'Donoghue's triad") involves injury to the ACL, MCL, and medial meniscus, and occurs when a lateral force is applied to the knee while the foot is fixed on the ground.

== Prevention ==
Interest in reducing non-contact ACL injury has been intense. The International Olympic Committee, after a comprehensive review of preventive strategies, has stated that injury prevention programs have a measurable effect on reducing injuries. These programs are especially important in female athletes who bear higher incidence of ACL injury than male athletes, and also in children and adolescents who are at high risk for a second ACL tear.

Researchers have found that female athletes often land with the knees relatively straight and collapsing inwards towards each other, with most of their bodyweight on a single foot and their upper body tilting to one side; these four factors put excessive strain on the ligaments on the knee and thus increase the likelihood of ACL tear. There is evidence that engaging in neuromuscular training (NMT), which focus on hamstring strengthening, balance, and overall stability to reduce risk of injury by enhancing movement patterns during high risk movements. Such programs are beneficial for all athletes, particularly adolescent female athletes.

Injury prevention programs (IPPs), are reliable in reducing the risk factors of ACL inquiries, referring to dominance theories. The ligament dominance theory reduced peak knee abduction moment but should be more focused on prioritizing individualized, task-specific exercises focusing on an athlete's risk profile. It is more beneficial than a generic program. There is an increase in hip and knee flexion angles, such as plyometrics and jump-landing tasks, which reduces the risk of quadriceps dominance. However, there were no changes found for peak vGRF (vertical ground reaction force), which measures for "softer" landings. Unfortunately, there was no conclusive data on how IPPs reduces the risk associated with leg dominance theory.

One effective strategy to lower ACL injury risk is to enhance tissue strength, thereby improving its ability to withstand greater loads. Studies have demonstrated that exercise can stimulate collagen regeneration in medial collateral ligamentous tissues of rabbits and ACL tissues of Rhesus monkeys, restoring them to 79% of healthy tissue strength after a period of immobilization. Surprisingly, there is a lack of published peer-reviewed studies showing that training can significantly increase strength in healthy ACL tissues through collagen regeneration. Moreover, research indicates that collagen concentration and ligament force tolerance in healthy ACL tissues decrease with age, highlighting the importance of reducing ACL loads. This can be achieved by adjusting athletes' technique during sports activities to lessen external joint loading or by enhancing the strength and activation of knee-supporting muscles when external joint loading is high.

== Treatment ==
Treatment for ACL tears is important to:

- Reduce abnormal knee movements and improve knee function
- Build trust and confidence to use the knee normally again
- Prevent further injury to the knee and reduce the risk of osteoarthritis
- Optimise long-term quality of life following the injury

=== Nonsurgical ===
Nonsurgical treatment for ACL rupture involves progressive, structured rehabilitation that aims to restore muscle strength, dynamic knee control and psychological confidence. A living systematic review with meta-analysis, updated in 2022, showed on the basis of three randomized controlled trials that primary rehabilitation with optional surgical reconstruction produces outcomes similar to early surgical reconstruction. In some cases the ACL may heal without surgery during the rehabilitation process—the torn pieces re-unite to form a functional ligament.

While modalities such as low-level laser therapy may help reduce pain following an ACL injury, evidence suggests they should not be used as a primary treatment. Functional recovery is best achieved through structured rehabilitation programs, with adjunct therapies like laser treatment used primarily for pain management.

The purpose of exercise treatment is to restore the normal functioning of the muscular and balance system around the knee. Research has demonstrated that by training the muscles around the knee appropriately through exercise treatment, the body can 'learn' to control the knee again, and despite extra movement inside the knee, the knee can feel strong and able to withstand force. Evidence suggests that not all ACL injuries require surgery, as some patients can have good outcomes with structured, progressive physical therapy. Conservative management may also include patient education on avoiding instability and the use of hinged knee braces to support knee function during rehabilitation.

Typically, this approach involves visiting a physical therapist or sports medicine professional soon after injury to oversee an intensive, structured program of exercises. Other treatments may be used initially, such as hands-on therapies in order to reduce pain. The physiotherapist will act as a coach through rehabilitation, usually by setting goals for recovery and giving feedback on progress.

Non-surgical recovery typically takes three to six months, and depends on the extent of the original injury, pre-existing fitness and commitment to the rehabilitation and sporting goals. Some patients may not be satisfied with the outcome of non-surgical management, and opt for surgery later.

=== Surgery ===
ACL reconstruction surgery involves replacing the torn ACL with a "graft," which is a tendon taken from another source. Grafts can be taken from the patellar tendon, hamstring tendon, quadriceps tendon from either the person undergoing the procedure ("autograft") or a cadaver ("allograft"). Of the three different kinds of autografts, quadriceps tendon grafts have shown to produce less pain at the site of the harvest when compared to patellar tendon and hamstring tendon grafts. Quadriceps tendon grafts have also been shown to produce better results when it comes to knee stability and function.

The surgery is done with an arthroscope or tiny camera inserted inside the knee, with additional small incisions made around the knee to insert surgical instruments. This method is less invasive and is proven to result in less pain from surgery, less time in the hospital, and quicker recovery times than "open" surgery (in which a long incision is made down the front of the knee and the joint is opened and exposed).

Young athletes or anyone opting for ACL surgery should consider delaying their surgery and completing a 4-6 week prehabilitation program. Although there is no consensus on what rehab should consist of, some of the basic parameters include restoring range of motion, decreasing swelling, and ensuring there is adequate quadriceps strength. Patients that received a 4-6 week prehab program had better outcomes in the acute phases of surgery. One study found that those who underwent a prehab regimen had better international knee documentation committee (IKDC) scores and knee injury and osteoarthritis outcomes scores (KOOS) in addition to a higher probability of returning to preinjury sport. The outcomes 3-6+ months out are still inconclusive.

The American Academy of Orthopedic Surgeons has stated that there is moderate evidence to support the guideline that ACL reconstruction should occur within five months of injury in order to improve a person's function and protect the knee from further injury; however, additional studies need to be done to determine the best time for surgery and to better understand the effect of timing on clinical outcomes. However, delaying ACL reconstruction in pediatric and adolescent populations for more than 3 months has been shown to increase the risk or meniscus injuries significantly.

There are over 100,000 ACL reconstruction surgeries per year in the United States. Over 95% of ACL reconstructions are performed in the outpatient setting. The most common procedures performed during ACL reconstruction are partial meniscectomy and chondroplasty. Asymmetry in the repaired knee is a possibility and has been found to have a large effect between limbs for peak vertical ground reaction force, peak knee-extension moment, and loading rate during double-limb landings, as well as mean knee-extension moment and knee energy absorption during both double- and single-limb landings. Analysis of joint symmetry along with movement patterns should be a part of return to sports criteria.

Tampa Scale of Kinesiophobia, and a question from the Knee injury and Osteoarthritis Outcome Score quality of life subscale. Results showed that nine athletes sustained a second ACL injury Athletes who experienced a second ACL injury had higher scores on the ACL-RSI and on the risk appraisal questions of the ACL-RSI, and they met RTS criteria sooner than athletes who did not sustain a second ACL injury. After reading, all second ACL injuries occurred in athletes who underwent primary ACL with hamstring tendon autografts.

=== Rehabilitation ===
The goals of rehabilitation following an ACL injury are to regain knee strength and motion. If an individual with an ACL injury undergoes surgery, the rehabilitation process will first focus on slowly increasing the range of motion of the joint, then on strengthening the surrounding muscles to protect the new ligament and stabilize the knee. Finally, functional training specific to the activities required for certain sports is begun. Delaying return to sport is recommended for at least a minimum of nine months, as retear rates become 7x more likely for those returning prior to 9 months. Additionally, it takes around 2 years for the ACL to mature; however, it is unrealistic to expect athletes to wait two years to return to sports. Another factor to consider is that 30% of retear rates occur within the first 30 athletic exposures and 50% within the first 72 athletic exposures. Lastly, a patient reduces their likelihood of a retear with each month they delay return to sport after the 9 month mark. In the pediatric setting, re-ruptures of the ACL post surgically are prevalent, 94.6% of which require a revision surgery. Without proper rehabilitation, growth or angular deformities can occur, also requiring a revision surgery. Patients need to ensure their physical therapist is experienced with treating ACL patients as many therapists can set their patients up for failure. More than half of physical therapists still utilize manual muscle testing techniques to measure leg strength for return to sports which is subjective and not reliable data. In addition, there is no agreed upon criteria for return to sport however there are considerations a therapist should make before clearing their patient. Patients should be put through battery of tests throughout their rehab to ensure their prepared for the demands of their sport. The tests should include a psychological component, plyometric testing, strength symmetry between both lower limbs, and different functional movement assessments that relate to the patients sport.

There are numerous guidelines regarding ACL rehabilitation recommendations and interventions. A Guideline Development Group (GDG), composed of impartial clinical and methodology experts, was formed and tasked with converting evidence into recommendations. Each member graded proposed recommendations anonymously, and the evidence that produced a high-percentage agreement were published.

Post-operative Strategies:

In 2022, a systematic review was conducted on ACL rehabilitation that refutes the usefulness of post-operative bracing. Despite its frequent use in common practive, bracing does not improve any functional outcomes and may in fact limit mobility unnecessarily. Emphasis should instead be placed on neuromuscular electrical stimulation, which has been shown to enhance muscle activation. Furthermore, it may reduce disuse atrophy, especially in the early recovery phase.

Timing and structure of rehabilitation recommendations:

1. Pre-operative rehabilitation is strongly recommended in order to improve post-operative quadriceps strength, knee range of motion and may decrease the time to return to sport. At least one pre-operative visit can be helpful to determine if there is sufficient voluntary muscle activation and to educate the patient on the post-operative rehabilitation route. Modal agreement: "strongly agree" (mean: 96.1%)
2. Unsupervised exercise is recommended for patients recovering from ACL reconstructive surgery. Patients who have reduced access to physical therapy and/or have high motivation and are compliant to perform their rehabilitation are encouraged to exercise independently. Patients who are not well educated on body mechanics should have exercise programs individually prescribed and be monitored to ensure proper execution of rehabilitation protocol to prevent progression with adverse events. Modal agreement: "strongly agree" (mean: 84.7%)
3. Duration of rehabilitation protocol is specific to an individual's needs and demonstration of their ability to safely return to preinjury level. Accelerated timelines can be used under the right conditions and without adverse events. Modal agreement: "strongly agree" (mean: 97%)

Modalities Recommendations:

1. Continuous passive motion does not offer additional benefit for pain, range of motion, or swelling when compared to active motion exercises. It is recommended against using this modality because of this, as well as it being time-consuming and costly. Modal agreement: "strongly agree" (mean: 75.5%)
2. Cryotherapy is inexpensive and easy to use. It also results in a high level of patient satisfaction and rarely has adverse events. The use of this modality is warranted in the early phase of postoperative management. Patients should be educated on how to safely apply cryotherapy to prevent injury. Compressive cryotherapy may be more effective, if available. Modal agreement: "strongly agree" (mean: 97%)
3. Neuromuscular electrical stimulation (NMES) is strongly recommended in the earliest phase after surgery. This modality will stimulate muscle activation while reducing the expected disuse muscle atrophy. In the early phase, NMES can be used during functional activities to further develop strength. Modal agreement: "strongly agree" (mean: 93.4%)
4. A low-load blood flow restriction (BFR) is encouraged, along with standardized care, in the early phase of rehabilitation. This modality can improve quadriceps and hamstring strength, especially in individuals experiencing increased knee pain and/or cannot tolerate loads applied to the knee joint. Before a clinician decides to incorporate BFR, they should be aware of contraindications. Modal agreement: "strongly agree" (mean: 92.6%)
5. Dry Needling is not recommended for early rehabilitation phase, as it can increase risk of hemorrhage. Modal agreement "strongly agree" (mean: 67.6%)
6. Whole-body vibration is effective as an additional intervention to improve quadriceps strength and static balance. However, there have been reported complications of pain and swelling due to use of this intervention. It is recommended to refrain from using this modality due to the complications and high-cost. Modal agreement "agree" (mean: 83.2%)

Return To Sport

Exercise interventions to help prevent secondary injury in return to sport. Exercise interventions consists of neuromuscular training, strength training, agility drills, and plyometrics. Exercises that are chosen are complementary of risk factors that could cause an ACL injury. Some plyometric and balance exercises that help the return to sport protocol include the triple hops, tuck jumps and box jumps, Nordic hamstrings and squats with hip abduction. Neuromuscular training is also very important in return to sport. Progressive perturbations on unstable surfaces that test unilateral and bilateral stance.

A program of five phases of rehab was created to recover and return to sport post ACLR. Phase one consisted of ROM and mobility, diminish pain and swelling, and strengthen the quadriceps muscles. Phase two is jogging on the treadmill. Phase three started agility drills in different body planes, fast bursting movements. Phase 4 starts plyometrics, jumping with both feet. Finally phase five progresses the bilateral jumps to unilateral leg hops. In the later stages the rehabilitation program should be tailored towards the primary sport the athlete is trying to return to.

In ACL-SPORTS programs an athlete must pass a predetermined return-to-sport test. The requirements are limb symmetry, there good sided leg strength is symmetrical to the ACLR side, of 90% in the quadriceps strength test, 90% in each of the four single-legged hop tests, 90% on the Knee Outcomes Survey-Activities of Daily Living scale (KOS-ADLs), and in general rating of self-perceived knee function. All athletes should achieve greater than 90% limb symmetry of good sided 1RM.

Psychological readiness is a crucial factor in determining when an athlete can safely return to sport following ACL reconstruction. Research suggests that objective and subjective psychological assessments should be incorporated into rehabilitation protocols, as athletes with higher psychological readiness scores have lower re-injury rates (Glattke et al., 2022). Additionally, high-intensity plyometric training has been found to be ineffective in ACL recovery and may not contribute to improved functional outcomes (Glattke et al., 2022).

== Prognosis ==
The prognosis of ACL injury is generally good, with many people regaining function of the injured leg within months. ACL injury used to be a career-ending injury for competitive athletes; however, in recent years ACL reconstruction surgery followed by physical therapy has allowed many athletes to return to their pre-injury level of performance.

Long term complications of ACL injury include early onset arthritis of the knee and/or re-tearing the ligament. Factors that increase risk of arthritis include severity of the initial injury, injury to other structures in the knee, and level of activity following treatment. Not repairing tears to the ACL can sometimes cause damage to the cartilage inside the knee because with the torn ACL, the tibia and femur bone are more likely to rub against each other. Nevertheless, ACL tears alone increase inflammatory markers in the knee which can have influence on the development of osteoarthritis.

Young female athletes have a significant risk of re-tearing an ACL graft, or tearing the ACL on the other knee after their recovery. This risk has been recorded as being nearly 1 out of every 4 young athletes. Therefore, athletes should be screened for any neuromuscular deficit (i.e. weakness greater in one leg than another, or incorrect landing form) before returning to sport.

== Epidemiology ==
There are around 200,000 ACL tears each year in the United States. ACL tears newly occur in about 69 per 100,000 per year with rates in males of 82 per 100,000 and females of 59 per 100,000. When breaking down rates based on age and sex, females between the ages of 14 and 18 had the highest rates of injury with 227.6 per 100,000. Males between the ages of 19 and 24 had the highest rates of injury with 241 per 100,000.

=== Sports ===
Rates of re-rupture among college athletes were highest in male football players with 15 per 10,000, followed by female gymnasts with 8 per 10,000 and female soccer players with 5.2 per 10,000.

High school athletes are at increased risk for ACL tears when compared to non-athletes. Among high school girls in the US, the sport with the highest risk of ACL tear is soccer, followed by basketball and lacrosse. In the US women's basketball and soccer experience the most ACL tears then all other sports. The highest risk sport for high school boys in the US was basketball, followed by lacrosse and soccer. In basketball, women are 5-8 times more likely to experience an ACL tear than men.

=== Dogs ===
Cruciate ligament rupture is a common orthopedic disorder in dogs. A study of insurance data showed the majority of the breeds with increased risk of cruciate ligament rupture were large or giant.
