= Rehabilitation (neuropsychology) =

Therapy to regain or improve neurocognitive function that has been lost or diminished

- Specialty: Neurology

Rehabilitation of sensory and cognitive function typically involves methods for retraining neural pathways or training new neural pathways to regain or improve neurocognitive functioning that have been diminished by disease or trauma. The main objective outcome for rehabilitation is to assist in regaining physical abilities and improving performance. Four common neuropsychological problems treatable with rehabilitation are attention deficit/hyperactivity disorder (ADHD), concussion, central nervous system fatigue, and spinal cord injury. Rehabilitation research and practices are a fertile area for clinical neuropsychologists, rehabilitation psychologists, and others.

== Methods ==
Physical therapy, neurophysiotherapy, speech therapy, occupational therapy, hot and cold therapy, and other methods that "exercise" specific brain functions are used. For example, eye–hand coordination exercises may rehabilitate certain motor deficits, or well-structured planning and organizing exercises might help rehabilitate executive functions following a traumatic blow to the head.

Brain functions that are impaired because of traumatic brain injuries are often the most challenging and difficult to rehabilitate. Much work is being done in nerve regeneration for the most severely damaged neural pathways.

Neurocognitive techniques, such as cognitive rehabilitation therapy, provide assessment and treatment of cognitive impairments from a variety of brain diseases and insults that cause persistent disability for many individuals. Such disabilities result in a loss of independence, a disruption in normal childhood activities and social relationships, and a loss in school attendance and educational and employment opportunities. Injuries or insults that may benefit from neurocognitive rehabilitation include traumatic and acquired brain injuries (e.g., stroke, concussion, neurosurgery, etc.), cranial radiation, intrathecal chemotherapy, and neurological disorders, such as ADHD. The rehabilitation targets cognitive functions such as attention, memory, and executive function (organization, planning, time management, etc.). Specific programs are tailored to develop and address an individual's challenges after a baseline assessment of abilities and challenges.

== Concussion ==
Much research and focus has been given to concussion suffered frequently by athletes. While the severity of brain trauma has been standardized for immediate "sideline" assessment, much work needs to be done to understand how to rehabilitate or accelerate the rehabilitation of athletes' brain function following serious concussion—whether consciousness is lost or a dazed/confused feeling is experienced or not. Currently, rehabilitation of concussive brain injury is based on rest and gradual return to normal activities with as much involvement as can be tolerated.

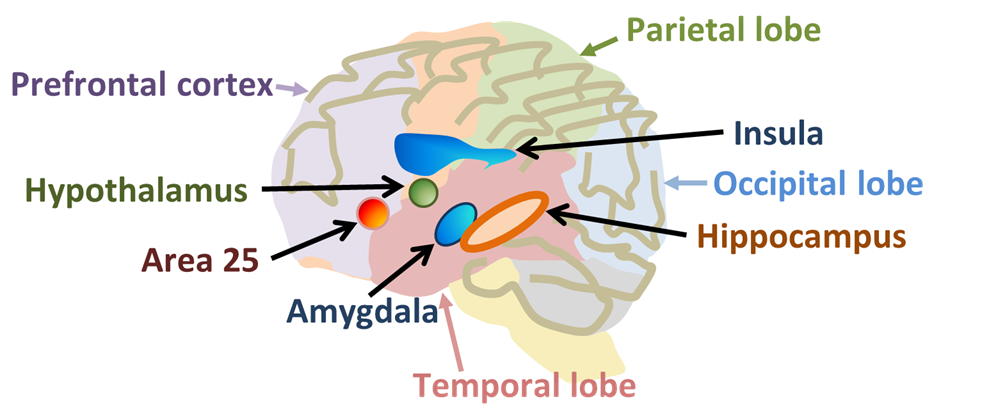
Various parts of the brain are responsible for different functions.

== Diagnosis tools ==
Standardized neuropsychological tests
These tasks have been designed so the performance on the task can be linked to specific neurocognitive processes. These tests are typically standardized, meaning that they have been administered to a specific group (or groups) of individuals before being used in individual clinical cases. The data resulting from standardization are known as normative data. After these data have been collected and analyzed, they are used as the comparative standard against which individual performances can be compared. Examples of neuropsychological tests include: the Wechsler Memory Scale (WMS), the Wechsler Adult Intelligence Scale (WAIS), Boston Naming Test, the Wisconsin Card Sorting Test, the Benton Visual Retention Test, and the Controlled Oral Word Association.

Brain scans
The use of brain scans to investigate the structure or function of the brain is common, either as simply a way of better assessing brain injury with high resolution pictures, or by examining the relative activations of different brain areas. Such technologies may include fMRI (functional magnetic resonance imaging) and positron emission tomography (PET), which yields data related to functioning, as well as MRI (magnetic resonance imaging) and computed axial tomography (CAT or CT), which yields structural data.

Global Brain Project
Brain models based on mouse and monkey have been developed based on theoretical neuroscience involving working memory and attention, while mapping brain activity based on time constants validated by measurements of neuronal activity in various layers of the brain. These methods also map to decision states of behavior in simple tasks that involve binary outcomes.

Electrophysiology
The use of electrophysiological measures designed to measure the activation of the brain by measuring the electrical or magnetic field produced by the nervous system. This may include electroencephalography (EEG) or magneto-encephalography (MEG).

Experimental tasks
The use of designed experimental tasks, often controlled by computer and typically measuring reaction time and accuracy on a particular tasks thought to be related to a specific neurocognitive process. An example of this is the Cambridge Neuropsychological Test Automated Battery (CANTAB) or CNS Vital Signs (CNSVS).

== See also ==
- Clinical neuropsychology – Sub-field of neuropsychology
- Cognitive neuropsychology – Relation of brain structure to psychological processes
- Neuropsychology – Study of the brain related to specific psychological processes and behaviors
- Occupational therapy – Healthcare profession
- Physical medicine and rehabilitation – Branch of medicine
- Physiotherapy – Profession that helps a disabled person function in everyday life
- Rehabilitation psychology – Specialty area of psychology
- Speech therapy – Disability therapy profession
