= FDI World Dental Federation =

International dentistry organization

- Fédération dentaire internationale
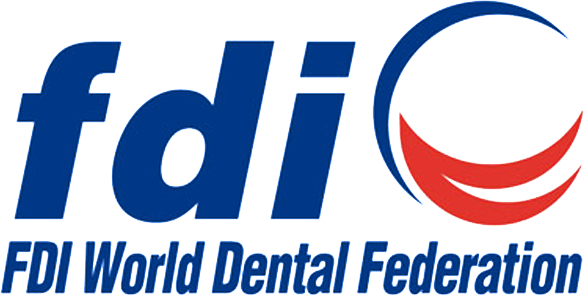
- Logo of the FDI World Dental Federation
- Abbreviation: FDI
- Founded: August 15, 1900; 126 years ago
- Founder: Charles Godon
- Type: International non-governmental organization
- Purpose: Dentistry and oral health
- Headquarters: Geneva, Switzerland
- Region served: Worldwide
- Members: National dental associations and specialist groups
- President: Nikolai Sharkov
- Website: www.fdiworlddental.org

The FDI World Dental Federation (FDI; French: Fédération dentaire internationale) is an international organization representing the dental profession. Founded in Paris in 1900, it is a federation of national dental associations and dental specialist groups and is one of the oldest international professional bodies dedicated to dentistry and the promotion of oral health. FDI is headquartered in Geneva, Switzerland, and has been in official relations with the World Health Organization since 1948.

== History ==
FDI was founded in Paris on 15 August 1900 by the French dentist Charles Godon, dean of the École Dentaire de Paris, together with a small group of colleagues. The federation was created to organize regular international dental congresses and to support professional exchange and education across national borders. The first annual International Dental Congress under the new federation was held in London in 1901.

In its early decades, FDI functioned chiefly as a scientific and professional forum. Its work was interrupted by the First and Second World Wars but resumed in the post-war period, and the organization later expanded from congress organization into policy development and public-health work. FDI entered into official relations with the World Health Organization in 1948. In 1950, the federation launched the International Dental Journal, succeeding the earlier FDI Bulletin.

In 1994, WHO and FDI jointly designated 1994 as the International Year of Oral Health. In 2005, Michele Aerden became the first woman elected president of the federation. Analyses published in the early twenty-first century described FDI as increasingly engaged in global health policy, particularly on oral disease prevention and the integration of oral health into the wider non-communicable disease agenda.

== Organization ==
FDI is a membership federation of national dental associations and specialist groups. Its General Assembly, also described as the World Dental Parliament, is the principal decision-making body and meets annually during the World Dental Congress. An elected Council oversees implementation of policy, and standing committees composed of member-association volunteers carry out programme work.

A 2005 article in the Bulletin of the World Health Organization reported that FDI then represented more than 900,000 dental professionals through 157 dental associations in 136 countries. Writing in the Journal of the American Dental Association in 2021, then-president G. K. Seeberger described FDI as working with close to 200 national dental associations and specialist groups from more than 130 countries.

== Activities ==
=== World Dental Congress ===
FDI organizes the annual World Dental Congress (WDC), which combines scientific sessions with meetings of its governing bodies. The congress grew out of the international congress model central to the federation's founding purpose. Recent congresses have been held in Shanghai (2020), Istanbul (2024), Shanghai (2025), and Prague (2026).

=== Policy and frameworks ===
FDI publishes policy statements and conceptual frameworks on oral health and dental practice. In 2016 its General Assembly adopted a revised definition of oral health that emphasized functional and psychosocial dimensions rather than the absence of disease alone.

In 2021, FDI published Vision 2030: Delivering Optimal Oral Health for All, a policy framework on the place of oral health in health systems. The FDI conceptual framework has also been applied in external research; a 2022 study in the International Dental Journal used it to examine oral health in a general adult population.

== Standards ==
FDI is associated with the FDI World Dental Federation notation, a two-digit system for designating teeth and areas of the oral cavity. The system, also published as ISO 3950, was originally developed by the federation and has been recognized by the World Health Organization. Dental literature describes the system as the most widely used dental notation outside the United States and as suitable for standardized clinical and research communication.

== World Oral Health Day ==
World Oral Health Day is an annual public-awareness observance organized by FDI. It was first declared in 2007 and initially observed on 12 September, the birth date of Charles Godon, but the campaign was not fully activated until 2013, when the date was moved to 20 March to avoid conflicting with the FDI World Dental Congress.

The observance has been marked by World Health Organization regional offices and other public-health institutions, which have used the day to promote oral health and advocate for universal health coverage that includes oral care.

== Relations with international bodies ==
FDI has been in official relations with the World Health Organization since 1948. A 2005 article in the Bulletin of the World Health Organization described FDI as one of the oral-health-related non-governmental organizations in official relations with WHO, and WHO lists published in 2023 and 2024 continued to include FDI among non-State actors in official relations with the organization.

FDI is one of the five member organizations of the World Health Professions Alliance (WHPA), alongside the International Council of Nurses, the World Medical Association, the International Pharmaceutical Federation, and World Physiotherapy. In November 2022, WHO and the WHPA signed a memorandum of understanding on health-workforce priorities, covering all five alliance members. FDI is also listed as a member of the NCD Alliance network.

== Partnerships ==
FDI has participated in long-running public-health partnerships with private-sector and academic partners. The best-documented example is its collaboration with Unilever Oral Care on school-based toothbrushing and oral-health education. A 2018 review in the International Dental Journal described twelve years of joint activity under the FDI–Unilever Brush Day & Night partnership. The earlier Live.Learn.Laugh. programme was evaluated by researchers at the University of Salford across 38 countries, with findings published in the International Dental Journal in 2011; the commissioning of that evaluation was reported in the British Dental Journal in 2009. The Salford evaluation was commissioned as part of the partnership, and the supporting papers were published in a journal supplement associated with the programme.

== Publications ==
FDI is the owner of the International Dental Journal, a peer-reviewed publication that succeeded the FDI Bulletin in 1950 and covers research, reviews, policy papers, and commentary in dentistry and oral health.

== See also ==
- Oral health
- World Health Professions Alliance
- International Dental Journal
- FDI World Dental Federation notation
- World Oral Health Day
