= WHPA =

WHPA may refer to:

- The World Health Professions Alliance, the international body that represents 47 million health care professionals worldwide
- The Women's Health Protection Act
- WHPA (FM), a radio station (89.7 FM) licensed to serve Macomb, Illinois, United States
- WLKE, a radio station (93.5 FM) licensed to serve Gallitzin, Pennsylvania, United States, which held the call sign WHPA from 1998 to 2011
