= Basic body-awareness methodology =

Basic Body Awareness Therapy (B-BAT) is a therapy approach integrating physical awareness and movement to improve mental health. It is an evidence-based treatment in physiotherapy developed in the 1970s. It offers a holistic approach to human movement, addressing physical, physiological, psychological, and existential dimensions of human existence.

B-BAT is mainly used in Scandinavia and promotes well-being, improving coping strategies, PTSD, anxiety, depression and several mental illness. It has also been used with patients with eating disorders. Physical difficulties such as stroke, fibromyalgia, chronic pain and pelvic/ hip problems have also been treated with B-BAT.

B-BAT is grounded in the movement system developed by French psychotherapist Jacques Dropsy. Its foundation is influenced by a variety of movement practices from both Western and Eastern traditions, including Alexander Technique, The Feldenkrais Method, Elsa Gindler Practices, the Idla system, Zen meditation, and Tai chi. These methodologies emphasize the role of the body and nonverbal communication as gateways to empowerment. Additionally, B-BAT incorporates principles from humanistic and existential philosophy, psychology, movement science, actor training, modern dance, and fine art.

The primary goal of B-BAT is to enhance body awareness and develop a deeper consciousness of movement. This is achieved by encouraging less effort and promoting better functionality in everyday activities such as lying down, sitting, standing, and walking. The program also includes voice and relational exercises, gentle massage and free breathing techniques with a consistent emphasis on balance and mindfulness.

B-BAT is supported by specialized assessment tools: the Body Awareness Rating Scale (BARS), the Body Awareness Scale (BAS), and the BAS- interview. These tools are integrated into a structured therapy model. Research has demonstrated its effectiveness in addressing various pathological conditions, highlighting its value in clinical settings.

Beyond patient care, B-BAT also fosters the personal and professional development of physiotherapists, enhancing their skills in clinical practice and research. It encourages a focus on experimental learning, shared knowledge, and qualitative research methodologies.

Widely recognized in mental health and community-based physiotherapy, B-BAT has gained particular prominence in Northern Europe. It has been introduced into university curricula through the efforts of trained B-BAT teachers. It is now part of numerous training and research programs. Furthermore, an expanding international network, originating from the Swedish and Norwegian practitioners, ensures the ongoing quality and standardization of the method.
