= Postural restoration =

Posture based approach to physical medicine

Postural restoration is a posture based approach to physical medicine. Its advocates claim that it improves postural adaptations, the function of the respiratory system and asymmetrical patterns. They claim that the treatment aims to maximize neutrality in the body through manual and non-manual exercise techniques designed to reposition, retrain, and restore these asymmetrical patterned positions. It is used by some physical therapy and athletic trainers.

Despite common preferences among physiotherapists for certain postures, there is little strong evidence that any specific posture leads to better medical outcomes.

== Mechanism ==
Advocates for this technique claim that it can improve breathing mechanics, including diaphragmatic function. They use the term "zone of apposition" to describe where the diaphragm attaches to the rib cage. The diaphragm's mechanical action and respiratory advantage depends on its relationship and anatomical arrangement with the rib cage.

== History ==
Physical therapist Ron Hruska developed his method postural restoration in the early 1990s. In 1999, he founded the Postural Restoration Institute, located in Lincoln, Nebraska, to train other healthcare professionals in his method.
