= Physical therapy practice act =

A physical therapy practice act is a statute defining the scope and practice of physical therapy within the jurisdiction, outlining licensing requirements for Physical Therapists and Physical Therapist Assistants, and establishing penalties for violations of the law. In the United States, each state enacts its own practice act, resulting in some variation among the states, though the Federation of State Boards of Physical Therapy (FSBPT) has drafted a model definition in order to limit this variation.

== Model definition of physical therapy for state practice acts ==
In 1997, the Federation of State Boards of Physical Therapy (FSBPT) published The Model Practice Act for Physical Therapy: A Tool for Public Protection and Legislative Change as a model framework to serve as a basis for inter-jurisdictional consistency among state physical therapy practice acts. The FSBPT published the 5th edition of this document in 2011. According to the introduction to the Fifth edition, "since 1997 many states have enacted large portions and, in some instances, nearly the entire Model Practice Act as their jurisdiction statute."

== List of practice acts ==
Physical therapy practice acts by jurisdiction
State/ Jurisdiction	Statute	Enacted	Licensing Authority	Practice Act Text
Alabama	(Title 34, Chapter 24, Article 5)	1965	State of Alabama Board of Physical Therapy	Ala. Title 34, Ch. 24, Art. 5
Alaska	(AS 08.84)		State Physical Therapy and Occupational Therapy Board	Statutes and Regulations: Physical Therapy and Occupational Therapy
Arizona	(Title 32, Ch. 19)		Arizona State Board of Physical Therapy	Arizona Rev. Statutes, Title 32, Ch. 19
Arkansas	(Ark. Code Ann. Sec. 17-93-403(a)(2)/-404)		Arkansas State Board of Physical Therapy	Arkansas Physical Therapy Act
California	(Business and Professions Code, Div. 2, Ch. 5.7)	1953	Physical Therapy Board of California	CA Business and Professions Code, Div 2, Chapter 5.7
Colorado	(Col. Rev. Statutes, Title 12, Art. 41)		Colorado State Physical Therapy Board	Col. Rev. Statutes, Title 12, Article 41
Connecticut	(CT Gen. Statutes, Ch. 376, Sec. 20.66-20.74)		CT Dept. of Public Health	CT Gen. Statutes, Ch. 376 (Sec. 20.66-20.74)
Delaware				
District of Columbia				
Florida				
Georgia				
Hawaii				
Idaho				
Illinois				
Indiana				
Iowa				
Kansas	(Kan. Statutes Ann., Ch. 65, Art. 29)	1963	Kansas State Board of Healing Arts	Kansas Statutes Ann. Chapter 65, Article 29
Kentucky				
Louisiana				
Maine				
Maryland				
Massachusetts	(Mass. Gen. Law, Title XVI, Ch. 112, Sec. 23 A-D)		Board of Registration in Allied Health Professionals	MGL, c.112, §23 A-D, 259 CMR 5.00
Michigan				
Minnesota	(MN Stat. Ch. 148, Sec. 65-78)	1951	Minnesota State Board of Physical Therapy	MN Stat. Ch. 148, Sec. 65-78
Mississippi				
Missouri	(RSMO Title 12, Ch. 334, Sec. 334.500-334.620)	1969	Missouri Division of Professional Registration	RSMO Title 12, Ch. 334, Sec. 334.500-334.620
Montana				
Nebraska				
Nevada				
New Hampshire				
New Jersey				
New Mexico				
New York				
North Carolina				
North Dakota				
Ohio				
Oklahoma				
Oregon				
Pennsylvania				
Puerto Rico				
Rhode Island				
South Carolina				
South Dakota				
Tennessee				
Texas				
U.S. Virgin Islands				
Utah				
Vermont				
Virginia				
Washington				
West Virginia				
Wisconsin				
Wyoming				
