= World Oral Health Day =

Annual holiday observed on 20 March

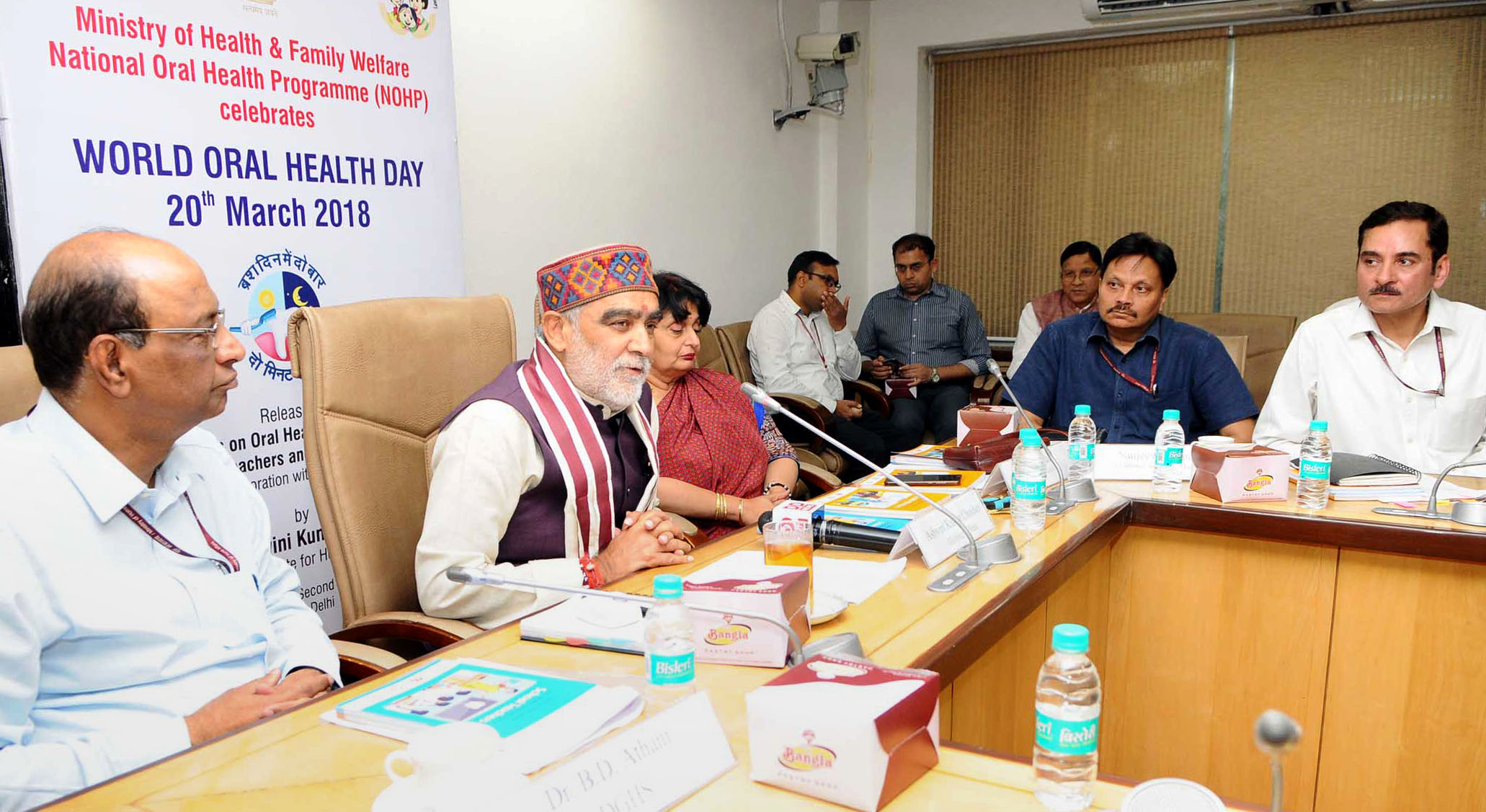
- A World Oral Health Day event in New Delhi
- Date: 20 March
- Next time: 20 March 2026
- Frequency: annual

World Oral Health Day is observed annually on 20 March, and launches a year-long campaign dedicated to raising global awareness of the issues around oral health and the importance of oral hygiene so that governments, health associations and the general public can work together to achieve healthier mouths and happier lives.

Of the world's population, 90% will suffer from oral diseases in their lifetime, many avoidable. Organized by FDI World Dental Federation, World Oral Health Day involves campaigns by national dental associations from around the world with activities in over 130 countries.

== History ==
World Oral Health Day was launched on 20 March 2013 by FDI World Dental Federation. The day also marks the launch of a year-long campaign to raise awareness of oral health and prevention of oral diseases. Since 2013 these campaigns have featured a specific theme.

FDI World Dental Federation partners with Dentsply Sirona, Haleon, Solventum, Smile Train, and Dental Tribune International Publishing on World Oral Health Day.

The annual award categories are:

- Most educational activity
- Best media campaign
- Best campaign by a dental students' association
- Most engaging community campaign

== Dental Students Campaign Competition ==
Since 2014 and in collaboration with its daughter organization, the International Association of Dental Students (IADS), FDI organizes an annual worldwide competition for best awareness and prophylactic activities held by dental student organizations in celebration of World Oral Health Day.

Winners of WOHD Dental Students Competition:

- 2014: Egypt and Sudan
- 2015: Turkey and Saudi Arabia
- 2016: Poland, Iraq (Kurdistan) and Egypt
- 2017: Spain, Egypt, Sudan and Palestine
- 2024: Student Association of the Faculty of Dental Medicine of the University of Porto (Portugal)

In February 2017, IADS launched WOHD Portal for organizing digitally the application and reviewing process of its national and local member organizations action plans and final reports.

== Themes ==
- 2013: Healthy Teeth for Healthy Life
- 2014: Brush for a Healthy Mouth!
- 2015: Smile for Life!
- 2016: It All Starts Here. Healthy mouth. Health body.
- 2017: Live Mouth Smart
- 2018: Say Ahh: Think Mouth, Think Health
- 2019: Say Ahh: Act On Mouth Health
- 2020: Say Ahh: Unite for Mouth Health
- 2021–2023: Be Proud of Your Mouth
- 2024 - 2026: A Happy Mouth is...A Happy Mind
  - Toothie Beaver, a cartoon dentist, joined Instagram in January 2024 and encouraged participation in the #BrushAndBoogie movement as part of World Oral Health Day
