= World Health Professions Alliance =

The World Health Professions Alliance is an alliance of the global bodies representing five health professions: dentistry, medicine, nursing, physical therapy and pharmacy. Together they represent 47 million health professionals in 179 countries and territories. The members of WHPA are: International Council of Nurses (ICN), International Pharmaceutical Federation (FIP), World Physiotherapy, FDI World Dental Federation and World Medical Association (WMA).

The aim of the Alliance is to facilitate collaboration among key health professions and major international stakeholders such as governments, policy makers and the World Health Organization. The Alliance operates under the philosophy that by working in collaboration, instead of along parallel tracks, the patient and health care system benefit. It provides global leadership for the professions and has a community building function between the professions. The Alliance regularly provides input to global health actors and processes from the perspective of the health professions. According to its current strategy (2024-27), it has three strategic goals:

1. Building a sustainable health workforce
2. Strengthening health systems
3. Championing collaborative practice

== Global health governance and relationship with WHO ==
In November 2022, WHPA members signed an historic memorandum of understanding (MoU) with WHO, at a ceremony attended by WHO Director General Dr. Tedros Adhanom Ghebreyesus and the Presidents and CEOs of FDI, FIP, ICN, WMA and World Physiotherapy. The document cemented a long-standing relationship and provides a framework for future collaboration between the partners. The MoU aims to enhance collaboration and protect and invest in the health workforce in order to provide safe, quality and equitable health care for populations around the world.

WHPA has throughout its history participated in global health governance through its statements delivered to national delegates and WHO policy makers at WHO’s global governance bodies: its Executive Board, held in late January of each year, which sets the agenda for the World Health Assembly (WHA) held annually in May. A list of all WHPA statements made to the EB and WHO since 2016 is available on the WHPA website.

WHPA regularly participates in WHO policy processes. For example it was represented on the Expert Advisory Group (EAG) to the Third Review of the WHO Global Code of Practice on the International Recruitment of Health Personnel (2024-6) by WMA. WHPA and its members also actively engaged with the drafting process for the WHO pandemic treaty, adopted by the WHA in 2025.

== Advocacy and communications ==
In addition to its work with WHO, many of WHPA’s current activities focus on advocacy and communications. It regularly issues press releases and policy statements, such as its Statement on Interprofessional Collaborative Practice, last updated in 2025.

It participates in global communications campaigns such as World Health Worker Week and World Humanitarian Day, setting its own focus within the broader agenda. Its own Positive Practice Environments campaign is ongoing.

In 2023 it launched an Open Letter calling for the safeguarding of healthcare facilities and personnel in areas of conflict, in accordance with international law which supporters can sign in solidarity.

It regularly organizes events such as side events at the World Health Assembly, and interprofessional webinars.

== Notable past activities ==
The WHPA Leadership Forum was held approximately every 2 years (2004, 2006; then 2012, 2015, 2017 and 2019). It brought together leaders from the member organizations and other stakeholders in global health to discuss and put into practice interprofessional and international collaboration on health issues across countries and settings.

The WHPA Regulation Conference was held in 2008, 2010, 2014, 2016 and 2018; a 2020 edition was planned but cancelled due to the Covid19 pandemic. The conferences brought together key players to share perspectives on the future effectiveness and accountability of health professional regulation.

WHPA carried out projects which included in-country workshops and activities. Examples include:

- Positive Practice Environments, which was launched in 2008 and expanded in 2010. It was re-launched as a purely advocacy-based campaign in 2020
- Campaign to fight counterfeits: "Be aware, take action", launched 2009; relaunched 2016
- NCD toolkit, which was launched in 2011 and expanded to include a smart phone app in 2014 (now discontinued). The Health Improvement Card remains available on the WHPA website.

2007 Core Competency Framework for International Health Consultants: The core competencies defined in the document are designed to shape international health consultants’ professional development and inform contract negotiations between client and employer.

== History and organization ==
The WHPA was founded by ICN, FDI and WMA in 1999 to address global health issues collectively and to promote interprofessional collaboration, with the secretariat run by ICN. FDI World Dental Federation became a member of the Alliance in 2005 and the World Confederation for Physical Therapy, now known as World Physiotherapy, joined in 2010. The secretariat moved to WMA in 2008 and was again managed in-house. In 2017 the secretariat rotated to be hosted by FDI, with WHPA now hiring an external secretariat manager to coordinate activities between members.
