= Anterior cruciate ligament =

Type of cruciate ligament in the human knee

- Diagram of the right knee. Anterior cruciate ligament labeled at center left.

Details
- From: Lateral condyle of the femur
- To: Intercondyloid eminence of the tibia

Identifiers
- Latin: ligamentum cruciatum anterius
- MeSH: D016118
- TA98: A03.6.08.007
- TA2: 1890
- FMA: 44614

The anterior cruciate ligament (ACL) is one of the cruciate ligaments in the human knee. The two ligaments are called "cruciform" ligaments, as they are arranged in a crossed formation. In the quadruped stifle joint (homologous to the knee), based on its anatomical position, it is also referred to as the cranial cruciate ligament. The term cruciate is Latin for cross. This name is fitting because the ACL crosses the posterior cruciate ligament to form an "X". It is composed of strong, fibrous material and assists in controlling excessive motion by limiting mobility of the joint. The anterior cruciate ligament is one of the four main ligaments of the knee, providing 85% of the restraining force to anterior tibial displacement at 30 and 90° of knee flexion. The ACL is the most frequently injured ligament in the knee.

== Structure ==
The ACL originates from deep within the notch of the distal femur. Its proximal fibers fan out along the medial wall of the lateral femoral condyle. The two bundles of the ACL are the anteromedial and the posterolateral, named according to where the bundles insert into the tibial plateau. The tibial plateau is a critical weight-bearing region on the upper extremity of the tibia. The ACL attaches in front of the intercondyloid eminence of the tibia, where it blends with the anterior horn of the medial meniscus.

== Purpose ==
The purpose of the ACL is to resist the motions of anterior tibial translation and internal tibial rotation; this is important to have rotational stability. This function prevents anterior tibial subluxation of the lateral and medial tibiofemoral joints, which is important for the pivot-shift phenomenon. The ACL has mechanoreceptors that detect changes in direction of movement, position of the knee joint, and changes in acceleration, speed, and tension. A key factor in instability after ACL injuries is having altered neuromuscular function secondary to diminished somatosensory information. For athletes who participate in sports involving jumping, sudden stops or rapid changes in direction, the knee must be stable in terminal extension, which is the screw-home mechanism.

== Clinical significance ==
=== Injury ===
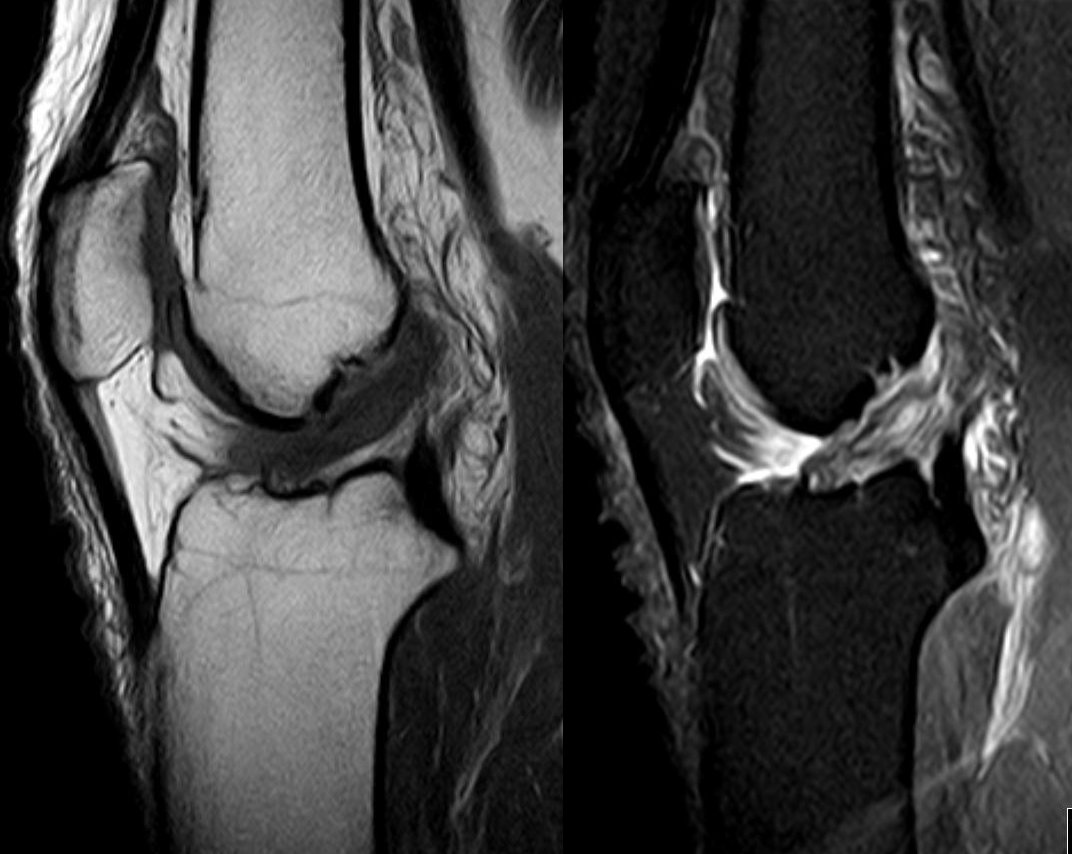
MRI of anterior cruciate ligament tear

An ACL tear is one of the most common knee injuries, with over 100,000 tears occurring annually in the US. Most ACL tears are a result of a non-contact mechanism such as a sudden change in a direction causing the knee to rotate inward, placing additional strain on the ACL since the femur and tibia, which are the two bones that articulate together forming the knee joint, move in opposite directions, causing the ACL to tear. Most athletes require reconstructive surgery on the ACL, in which the torn or ruptured ACL is completely removed and replaced with a piece of tendon or ligament tissue from the patient (autograft) or from a donor (allograft). Conservative treatment has poor outcomes in ACL injury, since the ACL is unable to form a fibrous clot, as it receives most of its nutrients from synovial fluid; this washes away the reparative cells, making the formation of fibrous tissue difficult.

The two most common sources for tissue are the patellar ligament and the hamstrings tendon. The patellar ligament is often used, since bone plugs on each end of the graft are extracted, which helps integrate the graft into the bone tunnels during reconstruction. The surgery is arthroscopic, meaning that a tiny camera is inserted through a small surgical cut. The camera sends video to a large monitor so the surgeon can see any damage to the ligaments. In the event of an autograft, the surgeon makes a larger cut to get the needed tissue. In the event of an allograft, in which material is donated, this is not necessary, since no tissue is taken directly from the patient's own body. The surgeon drills a hole forming the tibial bone tunnel and femoral bone tunnel, allowing for the patient's new ACL graft to be guided through. Once the graft is pulled through the bone tunnels, two screws are placed into the tibial and femoral bone tunnel.

Recovery time usually ranges between one and two years, but is sometimes longer, depending if the patient chose an autograft or allograft. A week or so after the occurrence of the injury, the athlete is usually deceived by the fact that he/she is walking normally and not feeling much pain; this is dangerous, as some athletes start resuming activities such as jogging, which with a wrong move or twist could damage the bones, as the graft has not completely become integrated into the bone tunnels. Injured athletes must understand the significance of each step of an ACL injury to avoid complications and ensure a proper recovery.

=== Nonoperative treatment of the ACL ===
ACL reconstruction is the most common treatment for an ACL tear, but it is not the only treatment available for individuals. Some may find it more beneficial to complete a nonoperative rehabilitation program. Individuals who are going to continue with physical activity that involves pivoting and rapid direction changes, and individuals who are no longer participating in those specific activities both are candidates for the nonoperative route. In comparing operative and nonoperative approaches to ACL tears, few differences were noted between surgical and nonsurgical groups, with no significant differences in regard to knee function or muscle strength reported by the patients.

The main goals to achieve during rehabilitation (rehab) of an ACL tear is to regain sufficient functional stability, maximize full muscle strength, and decrease risk of reinjury. Typically, three phases are involved in nonoperative treatment - the acute phase, the neuromuscular training phase, and the return to sport phase. During the acute phase, the rehab is focusing on the acute symptoms that occur right after the injury and are causing an impairment. The use of therapeutic exercises and appropriate therapeutic modalities is crucial during this phase to assist in repairing the impairments from the injury. The neuromuscular training phase is used to focus on the patient regaining full strength in both the lower extremity and the core muscles. This phase begins when the patient regains full range of motion, no effusion, and adequate lower extremity strength. During this phase, the patient completes advanced balance, proprioception, cardiovascular conditioning, and neuromuscular interventions. In the final, return to sport phase, the patient focuses on sport-specific activities and agility. A functional performance brace is suggested to be used during the phase to assist with stability during activities that require abrupt stops and rapid turning motions.

=== Operative treatment of the ACL ===
Anterior cruciate ligament surgery is a complex operation that requires expertise in the field of orthopedic and sports medicine. Many factors should be considered when discussing surgery, including the athlete's level of competition, age, previous knee injury, other injuries sustained, leg alignment, and graft choice. Typically, four graft types are possible, the bone-patella tendon-bone graft, the semitendinosus and gracilis tendons (quadrupled hamstring tendon), quadriceps tendon, and an allograft. Although extensive research has been conducted on which grafts are the best, the surgeon typically chooses the type of graft with which he or she is most comfortable. If rehabilitated correctly, the reconstruction should last. In fact, 92.9% of patients are happy with graft choice.

Prehabilitation has become an integral part of the ACL reconstruction process. This means that the patient exercises before getting surgery to maintain factors such as range of motion and strength. Based on a single leg hop test and self-reported assessment, prehab improved function; these effects were sustained 12 weeks postoperatively.

Postsurgical rehabilitation is essential in the recovery from the reconstruction. This typically takes a patient 6 to 12 months to return to life as it was prior to the injury. The rehab can be divided into protection of the graft, improving range of motion, decrease swelling, and regaining muscle control. Each phase has different exercises based on the patients' needs. For example, while the ligament is healing, a patient's joint should not be used for full weight-bearing, but the patient should strengthen the quadriceps and hamstrings by doing quad sets and weight shifting drills. Phase two would require full weight-bearing and correcting gait patterns, so exercises such as core strengthening and balance exercises would be appropriate. In phase three, the patient begins running, and can do aquatic workouts to help with reducing joint stresses and cardiorespiratory endurance. Phase four includes multiplanar movements, thus enhancing a running program and beginning agility and plyometric drills. Lastly, phase five focuses on sport- or life-specific motions, depending on the patient.

A 2010 Los Angeles Times review of two medical studies discussed whether ACL reconstruction was advisable. One study found that children under 14 who had ACL reconstruction fared better after early surgery than those who underwent a delayed surgery. For adults 18 to 35, though, patients who underwent early surgery followed by rehabilitation fared no better than those who had rehabilitative therapy and a later surgery.

The first report focused on children and the timing of an ACL reconstruction. ACL injuries in children are a challenge because children have open growth plates in the bottom of the femur or thigh bone and on the top of the tibia or shin. An ACL reconstruction typically crosses the growth plates, posing a theoretical risk of injury to the growth plate, stunting leg growth, or causing the leg to grow at an unusual angle.

The second study noted focused on adults. It found no significant statistical difference in performance and pain outcomes for patients who receive early ACL reconstruction vs. those who receive physical therapy with an option for later surgery. This would suggest that many patients without instability, buckling, or giving way after a course of rehabilitation can be managed nonoperatively, but was limited to outcomes after two years and did not involve patients who were serious athletes. Patients involved in sports requiring significant pivoting, twisting, or rapid changes in motion or direction may not be able to participate in these activities without ACL reconstruction.

=== ACL injuries in women ===
Risk differences between outcomes in men and women can be attributed to a combination of multiple factors, including anatomical, hormonal, genetic, positional, neuromuscular, and environmental factors. The size of the anterior cruciate ligament is often the most reported difference. Studies look at the length, cross-sectional area, and volume of ACLs. Researchers use cadavers, and in vivo placement to study these factors, and most studies confirm that women have smaller anterior cruciate ligaments. Other factors that could contribute to higher risks of ACL tears in women include patient weight and height, the size and depth of the intercondylar notch, the diameter of the ACL, the magnitude of the tibial slope, the volume of the tibial spines, the convexity of the lateral tibiofemoral articular surfaces, and the concavity of the medial tibial plateau. While anatomical factors are most talked about, extrinsic factors, including dynamic movement patterns, might be the most important risk factor when it comes to ACL injury.

== Gallery ==
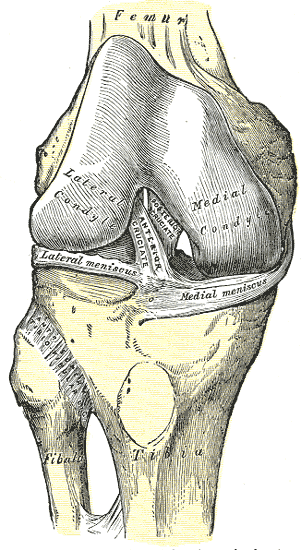
Right knee joint, from the front, showing interior ligaments

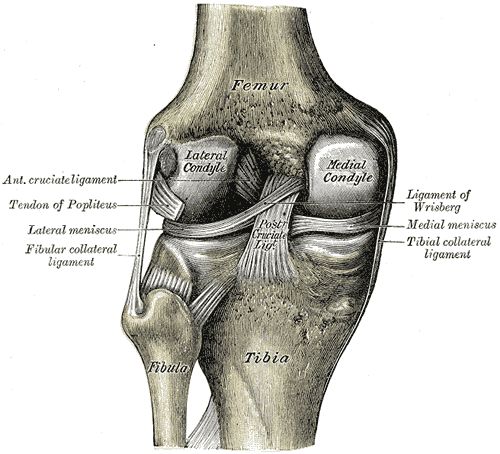
Left knee joint from behind, showing interior ligaments

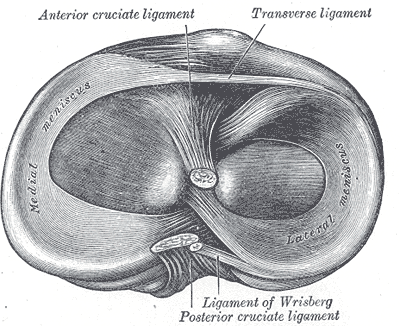
Head of right tibia seen from above, showing menisci and attachments of ligaments

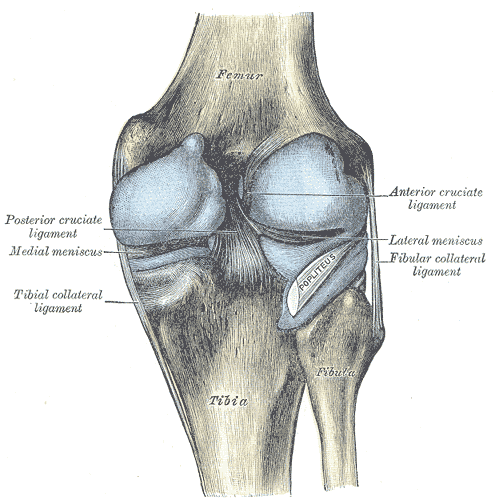
Capsule of right knee-joint (distended), posterior aspect

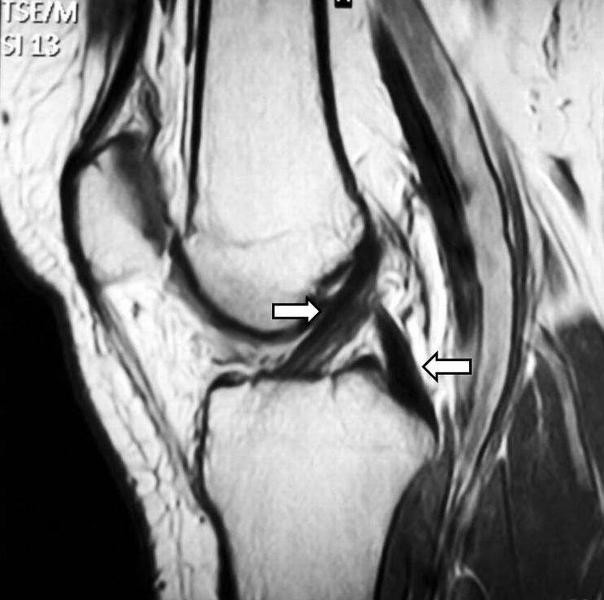
MRI shows normal signal of both cruciate ligaments (arrows)

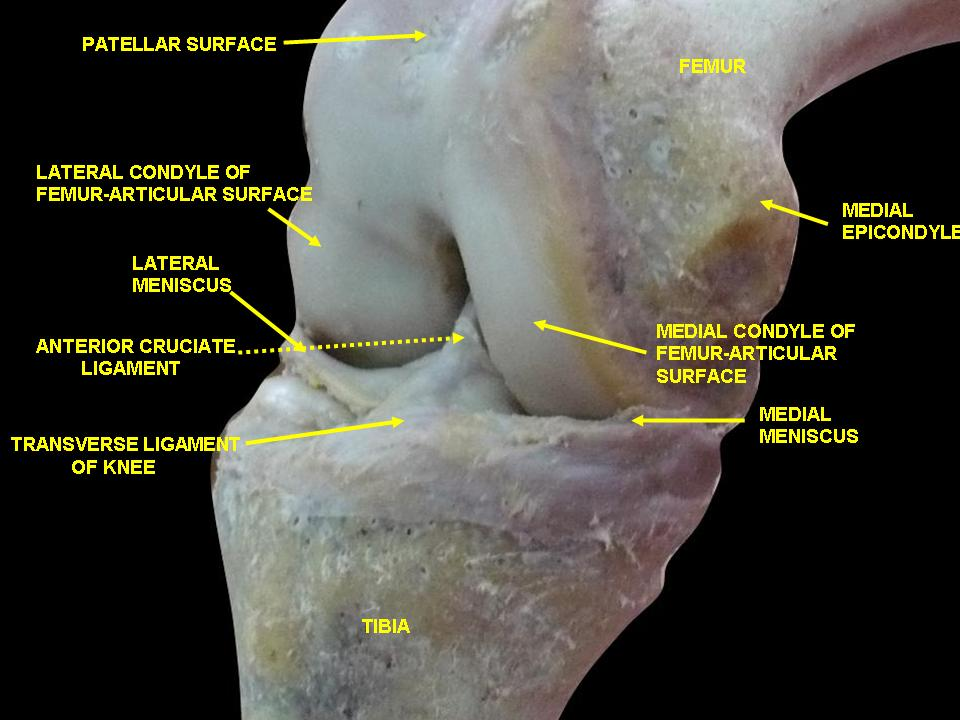
Knee joint, deep dissection, anteromedial view

== See also ==
- Posterior cruciate ligament
- Anterior cruciate ligament reconstruction
- Anterior drawer test
- Anterolateral ligament
- Lateral collateral ligament
- Medial collateral ligament
- Unhappy triad
