= World Physiotherapy =

International non-profit organisation for physical therapists

- Founded: 1951; 75 years ago
- Type: Non-profit organisation
- Headquarters: Southwark, England
- President: Michel Landry
- CEO: Sidy Dieye
- Website: world.physio
- Formerly called: World Confederation for Physical Therapy (WCPT)

World Physiotherapy is the international organisation for physiotherapy World Physiotherapy is the operating name of World Confederation for Physical Therapy (WCPT).

World Physiotherapy is a non-profit organisation, and its previous name (World Confederation for Physical Therapy) is registered as a charity in the United Kingdom. It has been in official relations with the World Health Organization (WHO) since 1952, collaborating on work programmes to improve world health. It works with a wide range of other international bodies and is a member of the World Health Professions Alliance. It has signed a "memorandum of understanding" with the four other members of the World Health Professions Alliance "to enhance their joint collaboration on protecting and investing in the health workforce to provide safe, quality and equitable care in all settings".

== History ==
The World Confederation for Physical Therapy was founded in 1951 by 11 national physiotherapy organizations from Australia, Canada, Denmark, Finland, Great Britain, New Zealand, Norway, South Africa, West Germany, Sweden, and the United States. The first international congress and second general meeting were held in London in 1953, where the first executive committee was elected.

Plans for a name change to "World Physiotherapy" were announced on 28 January 2020: "World Physiotherapy will be used for all externally-facing communications and materials. World Confederation for Physical Therapy will continue to be used for all legal and governance matters." The rebranding was publicised on 30 June 2020.
