= Neurophysiotherapy =

Branch of physiotherapy

Neurophysiotherapy, or neurological physiotherapy, is a branch of physiotherapy which treats motor deficits arising from pathology in the nervous system. The typical manifestation of neurological dysfunctions (pathology) is associated with diseases of the central nervous system. Neurophysiotherapy is also called Neurological physical therapy, Neurological physiotherapy or Neurological rehabilitation.

== Overview ==
Neurophysiotherapy is a holistic approach that aims to restore movement, improve balance, build strength, and help patients with neurological diseases return to daily activities. It includes managing secondary symptoms like muscle stiffness, preventing complications, providing mobility aids, and most importantly, educating patients and their families on managing their condition. Neurophysiotherapists are trained in the analysis of ‘normal movement’. This involves knowing how the body moves in ‘normal situations’ and how the biomechanics of the body work to allow efficient movement. A range of resources constitute current clinical practice in the assessment of people with a neurological condition, including textbooks, recommendations from professional associations and government bodies, disability frameworks such as the International Classification of Functioning, Disability and Health (ICF), and condition-specific guidelines. Neurophysiotherapy utilizes a diverse range of evidence-based methods and interventions tailored to help the brain and nervous system remodel themselves—a framework known as neuroplasticity. Because neurological conditions manifest differently in every individual, therapists select and combine several specialized approaches. Neurophysiotherapeutic interventions are hypothesized to optimize neural transmission between the central nervous system (CNS) and peripheral musculature. Specifically, these therapeutic modalities aim to restore homeostatic equilibrium within the clinical immuno-neuro-endocrine axis by modulating neural regulatory mechanisms. Consequently, this modulation regulates the pulsatile and rhythmic secretion of inhibitory neurotransmitters and endocrine signaling molecules. The resulting hormonal surges directly potentiate signal transduction along the neuromuscular pathways, reinforcing the functional link between the CNS and peripheral skeletal muscle effectors.

=== Neuroplasticity ===
Neuroplasticity refers to the brain's ability to modify its neurostructures and functionality based on systematic impacts during a relevant period. These impacts can stem from external environmental stimuli, reactions to traumatic lesions or pathological changes, and the individual's development process. Synaptic plasticity, a particular type of neuroplasticity is the ability of the nervous system to modify the intensity of interneuronal relationships (synapses), to establish new ones and to eliminate some. This property allows the nervous system to modify its structure and functionality in a more or less lasting way and dependent on the events that influence them such as experience or neuromodulation.

Neurophysiotherapy uses principles of neuroplasticity to help patients recover from neurological damage by creating new neuronal pathways to restore function. Therapists stimulate this process through repeated, targeted, and specific exercises, sensory stimulation, and other techniques.

The systematic impact of novel experiences, learning, and skill acquisition induces adaptive neuroplasticity, correlating with increases in both the volume and density of cortical gray matter. This structural remodeling is driven by synaptogenesis and potential architectural expansion of parenchymal components (such as neurons and glial cells) within localized, functionally activated regions. The underlying mechanisms operate on a distinct temporal trajectory: (a) initial phases are characterized predominantly by cellular proliferation; (b) subsequent phases shift toward the optimization of structural density and synaptic connectivity. Targeted behavioral interventions—including physical exercise, mindfulness meditation, and musical training—have been demonstrated to catalyze significant structural hypertrophic changes in specific neural networks, with certain adaptations manifesting on a rapid timeline.

Empirical data demonstrate that quantifiable structural alterations in neuronal architecture driven by neuroplasticity can manifest within a 2-to-3-month window of systematic intervention. A comprehensive review of the scientific literature indicates that the systematic administration of cognitive load via computer-based tasks, aggregating a total duration of 16 training hours (distributed as several hours of weekly engagement), induces significant modifications in both cerebral structure and functional connectivity. Notably, the precise nature and magnitude of these neuroanatomical adaptations are highly contingent upon the specific modalities and parameters of the applied cognitive stimulus. Research has documented an increase in grey matter thickness after a three-month training course consisting of 26 hours of systematic exercise.

=== Restoring Immuno-Neuro-Endocrine Homeostasis ===
Neurophysiotherapeutic methods utilize biophysical vectors—specifically acoustic waves, pulsed electromagnetic fields (PEMFs), and photonic stimuli—to facilitate the restoration of homeostatic equilibrium within the immuno-neuro-endocrine axis. These biophysical interventions transmit precise energy profiles to directly modulate central neural regulatory networks, attenuate systemic pro-inflammatory signaling cascades, and normalize neuroendocrine secretory pathways.

The mechanistic foundation for the therapeutic restoration of immuno-neuro-endocrine homeostasis is derived from endogenous, evolutionarily conserved physiological processes characteristically active during gestation. Specifically, embryonic morphogenesis requires precise spatio-temporal regulation of cellular mechanics to govern complex behaviors, including morphology alterations, junctional remodeling, migration, mitosis, and extrusion. This dynamic process is mediated by mechanical forces, hydrostatic pressure, and cellular viscoelastic properties. While these dynamics suggest a systemic developmental blueprint, recent biophysical frameworks challenge purely deterministic genetic models. Collinet and Lecuit (2021) highlight specific cellular forces drive four fundamental tissue deformations: folding/invagination, flow/extension, hollowing, and branching. This challenges the nativist paradigm that anatomical form is entirely encoded within the genome, as genetic sequences dictate linear polypeptide translation rather than real-time temporal coordination. Tissue geometry and mechanical feedback loops function as critical sources of morphogenetic information alongside biochemical pathways. Consequently, these constraints define the spatio-temporal scales of cellular behaviors, demonstrating that morphogenesis is a multi-scale, biophysical emergent phenomenon. This structural orchestration necessitates strict coordination across cellular ensembles; cell mechanics and associated cell behaviors should be robustly organized in space and time during tissue morphogenesis. The precise coordination of temporal neuronal activity within the developing fetus is fundamental to the assembly of early cortical architecture, the maturation of sensory pathways, and the integration of large-scale neural networks. Pathological disruptions or a lack of structured sensory environments during the pregnancy can lead to severe neurodevelopmental aberrancies, often manifesting postnatally as processing deficits or compromised synaptic plasticity. Consequently, understanding non-invasive neuromodulatory inputs that naturally guide the organization of fetal brain states remains a primary frontier in prenatal medicine. Elucidating these mother’s biophysical forces, which sustain fetal homeostatic equilibrium within the clinical immuno-neuro-endocrine axis by modulating neural regulatory mechanisms, provides a framework for engineering biomimetic therapeutic interventions for neurological disorders. By deciphering these endogenous regulatory pathways, novel Nature-inspired strategies can be developed to mitigate neuropathology and restore neurodevelopmental homeostasis.

== Conditions ==
Neurophysiotherapy addresses conditions like central nervous system fatigue, migraines, neurodegenerative disorders, dysmenorrhea, head injury, spinal cord injury, loss of cognitive function from aging as well as balance disorders such as cerebral palsy (and movement disorders), degenerative diseases such as Parkinson’s disease, multiple sclerosis, Alzheimer’s disease, polyneuropathy (e.g., diabetic neuropathy or Guillain–Barré syndrome), peripheral nerve injuries, and acute cases such as patients recovering from stroke and elders recovering from COVID-19.

== History ==
The Scottish anatomist and neurologist Charles Bell (1774–1842) was the first to distinguish between motor and sensory nerves and proposed the concept of a “muscle sense”. He contributed to the scientific study of the relationship between the brain, the nervous system, and the muscles, paving the way for understanding feedback mechanisms, so crucial to the success of rehabilitative processes in neurophysiotherapy.

At the end of the 19th century, the work of the German neurologist Johannes Karl Eugen Alfred Goldscheider (1858–1935) on the somatosensory system added essential contributions to the clarification of the human proprioceptive apparatus and permitted the triumph of the concept of “motor re-education” proposed by the French neurologist Fulgence Raymond (1844–1910). This concept was of paramount importance for the management of disabled persons and was instrumental in the development of various rehabilitative techniques in the course of the nineteenth century.

As early as the end of the 19th century, physiotherapists incorporated spinal manipulative therapy, which is largely neurophysiological in origin, into their practice.

In 1896, Prof. Jacques-Arsène d'Arsonval conducted the first documented study of the effects of a time-variable magnetic field on the brain, that produced physiological changes: a volunteer reported vertigo when a coil stimulated his head at 42 Hz.

== See also ==
- Bobath concept
- Frenkel exercises
