= Pivot-shift test =

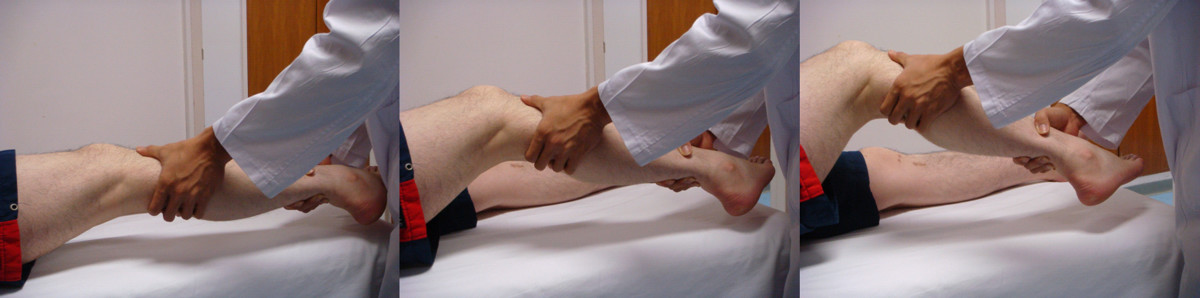
Pivot-shift test

The pivot-shift test is one of the three major tests for assessing anterior cruciate injury or laxity, the other two being the anterior drawer and Lachman test. However, unlike the other two, it tests for instability, an important determinant as to how the knee will function. In fact, it is instability, not simply the injury to the anterior cruciate ligament itself, that places the menisci at future risk, and gives rise to the feeling that the "knee is not secure" or "may give out".

This test is performed with the patient lying in the supine position with the hip passively flexed to 30 degrees and it is important to abduct the hip to relax the iliotibial tract and allow the tibia to rotate. The examiner stands lateral to the patient on the side of the knee that is being examined. The lower leg and ankle is grasped maintaining 20 degrees of internal tibial rotation. The knee is allowed to sag into complete extension. The opposite hand grasps the lateral portion of the leg at the level of the superior tibiofibular joint, increasing the force of internal rotation. While maintaining internal rotation, a valgus force is applied to the knee while it is slowly flexed. If the tibia's position on the femur reduces as the knee is flexed in the range of 30 to 40 degrees or if there is an anterior subluxation felt during extension the test is positive for instability.

Pivot-shift is not straightforward to perform. For many with instability, the reproduction of instability is unpleasant and 'visceral'. Accordingly, having experienced it once, the patient is unlikely to relax enough for a second or confirmatory test. This is probably why the sensitivity of the three major knee exams is increased with general anesthesia. Similarly, with meniscal involvement, such as a bucket handle tear of the medial meniscus, range of motion may be limited and muscle guarding may produce a false negative result.
