= Movement assessment =

Movement assessment is the practice of analysing movement performance during functional tasks to determine the kinematics of individual joints and their effect on the kinetic chain. Three-dimensional or two-dimensional analysis of the biomechanics involved in sporting tasks can assist in prevention of injury and enhancing athletic performance. Identification of abnormal movement mechanics provides physical therapists and Athletic trainers the ability to prescribe more accurate corrective exercise programs to prevent injury and improve exercise rehabilitation and progression following injury and assist in determining readiness to return to sport.

Movement has to be differentiated from the concept of motion. Movement assessment means to estimate inability, means to examine something based on different factors.

A good examination of joint movement, in addition to helping the physical therapist diagnose the patient's functional loss, can provide an objective criteria to determine the effectiveness of a treatment program. The complete or partial movement of an articulation is called range of movement. The range of movement differs from one joint to another. The maximum limit of a joint movement can be reached in two ways: actively or passively.

== Landing Error Scoring System (LESS) ==
The LESS is a valid and reliable tool for the biomechanical assessment of the jump landing technique. The LESS involves the scoring of 22 biomechanical criteria of the lower extremity and trunk, with the outcomes being associated with the risk of anterior cruciate ligament (ACL) and patellofemoral injury. LESS scoring is split into the following categories: excellent (0-3); good (4-5); moderate (6-7); and poor (>7). Identification of biomechanical abnormalities in landing technique, the effect of fatigue and differences between gender allow for more precise clinical exercise intervention to reduce the risk of injury.

The Functional Movement Screen (FMS) is a brief movement-screening tool designed to evaluate fundamental movement patterns and to identify limitations, asymmetries and movement-related pain that may require further assessment or corrective intervention. The FMS and its corrective algorithm were developed from work by Gray Cook and colleagues; the approach was described in two foundational articles by Cook, Burton and Hoogenboom (2006).

Purpose and scope. The FMS is intended as a practical screening tool for movement quality and functional status rather than as a diagnostic test for specific pathologies. It provides a simple grading system to capture movement-pattern quality, highlight the greatest areas of movement deficiency, and reveal limitations or asymmetries that can guide further assessment and corrective strategies. The Functional Movement Systems organisation — co-founded by Gray Cook and Lee Burton — publishes the official FMS materials and training resources used by practitioners worldwide.

Components. The FMS comprises seven movement tests that require a balance of mobility and stability. The standard seven tests are Deep Squat, Hurdle Step, Inline Lunge, Shoulder Mobility, Active Straight-Leg Raise, Trunk Stability Push-Up, and Rotary Stability. Tests are commonly administered in an order that moves from standing to ground positions for efficiency.

Scoring. Each test is scored on a 0–3 scale. Five of the seven tests require right/left side scoring (raw scores); the final score for a bilateral test is the lower (worse) of the two sides. The total screen score is the sum of the seven final scores (maximum 21). Scoring conventions are summarized as follows:

3 — Performs the movement as directed without compensations (meets the criteria).

2 — Performs the movement but with compensations or requires an accommodation (for example, heels elevated on a board to achieve the Deep Squat).

1 — Unable to perform the movement pattern even with accommodations.

0 — Pain is present during the test (or a related clearing test is positive); any test provoking pain is scored 0 and the painful area should be evaluated by a medical professional.

Clearing tests. The FMS includes specific clearing (exclusion) checks (commonly recorded on the score sheet as Ankle Clearing, Extension Clearing and Shoulder Clearing) to determine whether pain is provoked by certain motions. A positive clearing test (pain provocation) results in a 0 for the related screen item and indicates the need for medical evaluation of the painful structure. Some clearing procedures (for example, the Inline Lunge ankle mobility setup) use an ancillary green/yellow/red notation for mobility but pain still produces a 0 for scoring purposes.

Interpretation and corrective priority. Although the numeric total ranges from 0 to 21, FMS guidance emphasizes eliminating pain and asymmetries and achieving at least a score of 2 on each movement rather than simply maximizing the numeric total. Asymmetries and pain take priority when selecting corrective interventions and deciding on further evaluation or referral. The FMS corrective algorithm is designed to use the screen results to prioritise the “weak link” and guide corrective exercise and further assessment.

The FMS is used by fitness, sports-performance and healthcare professionals as a quick, standardised method for screening movement quality, exposing functional asymmetries and informing corrective or referral decisions.

== Romberg Test ==
The Romberg test evaluates static balance and it consists of maintaining a standing position with your feet together, arms at your sides and eyes closed. During this test, the ability to maintain the posture without losing balance is evaluated. This test is very helpful with elderly population or people recovering from any type of injuries.

== Adams test ==
The Adams test consists of observing a person's spine from different angles to detect possible deviations or misalignments. This test is especially useful in detecting scoliosis and other spinal disorders.

It consists of doing a forward flexion of the trunk with the feet hip-width apart, the knees extended and the hands straight, trying to touch the tips of the feet. When bending down, and if you look at the patient from the front, you can see if there is a considerable elevation on one side of the trunk (presence of a hump on the ribs). If this occurs, it is appropriate to consult a physiotherapist or specialist for possible additional evaluations.

== Unsupported single leg squat ==
The single leg squat is an exercise that was developed into a functional test by Liebenson to examine the biomechanics of the lower extremity, assess hip muscle dysfunction and provide an indication of mechanics during daily functional tasks. The test requires the person to stand on the limb being tested, with the non-weight bearing limb in about 45° of hip flexion and about 90° of knee flexion. The person's arms should be in 90° of shoulder flexion and full elbow extension. The athlete is required to squat down to at least 60° of knee flexion and return to the start position within 6 seconds.

== Single Leg Hop for Distance ==
Single leg hop tests are commonly used to assess functional knee performance by assessing limb symmetry after an anterior cruciate ligament injury or following anterior cruciate ligament reconstruction. The hop tests mainly used are: the single leg hop for distance; crossover hop test; triple hop test; 6m timed hop test; square hop test and side-to-side hop test. The limb symmetry is assessed by means of the limb symmetry index (LSI). Normal values for return to play criteria following ACL reconstruction indicate that the injured limb should be greater than or equal to 90% of the uninjured limb.
