= Physical therapy =

Profession that helps a disabled person function in everyday life

Physical therapy / physiotherapy
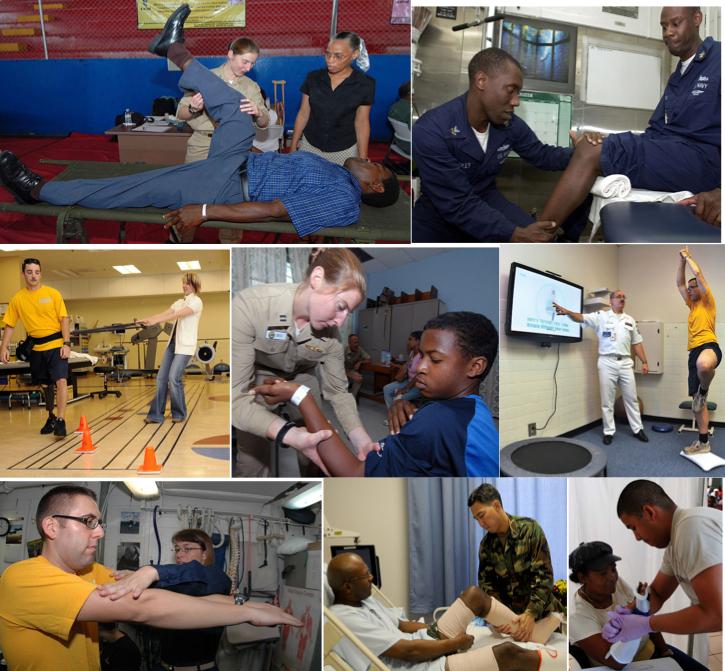
- Military physical therapists working with patients on balance problems, orthopedics, amputation, and examining the patient's strength, flexibility, joint range of motion, and gait.
- ICD-9-CM: 93.0-93.3
- MeSH: D026761

Physical therapy (PT), also known as physiotherapy, is a healthcare profession, as well as the care provided by physical therapists. It focuses on promoting, maintaining, or restoring health through patient education, physical interventions, disease prevention, and health promotion. The term physical therapist or physiotherapist is used to represent the trained person providing physical therapy.

The profession has many specialties including musculoskeletal, orthopedics, cardiopulmonary, neurology, endocrinology, sports medicine, geriatrics, pediatrics, women's health, wound care and electromyography. PTs practice in many settings, both public and private.

In addition to clinical practice, other aspects of physical therapy include research, education, consultation, and health administration. Physical therapists provide primary care patient management in conjunction with other medical services. In some jurisdictions, such as the United Kingdom, physical therapists may have the authority to prescribe medication.

== Overview ==
Physical therapy addresses illnesses or injuries that limit a person's ability to move and perform functional activities in their daily lives. PTs use an individual's history and physical examination to arrive at a diagnosis and establish a management plan and, when necessary, incorporate the results of laboratory and imaging studies like X-rays, CT scans, or MRIs. Physical therapists can use sonography to diagnose and manage common musculoskeletal, nerve, and pulmonary conditions. Electrodiagnostic testing (e.g., electromyograms and nerve conduction velocity testing) may also be used.

PT management commonly includes the prescription of, or assistance with, specific exercises, manual therapy, and bodily manipulation. Additional treatments include mechanical devices such as traction; education; electrophysical modalities which include heat, cold, electricity, sound waves, and radiation; assistive devices; prostheses; and orthoses. In addition, PTs work with individuals to prevent the loss of mobility before it occurs by developing fitness and wellness-oriented programs for healthier and more active lifestyles, and providing services to individuals and populations to develop, maintain, and restore maximum movement and functional ability throughout life. This includes providing treatment in circumstances where movement and function are threatened by aging, injury, disease, or environmental factors. Functional movement is central to what it means to be healthy.

Physical therapy is a profession which has many specialties including musculoskeletal, orthopedics, cardiopulmonary, neurology, endocrinology, sports medicine, geriatrics, pediatrics, women's health, wound care and electromyography. PTs practice in many settings, such as privately owned physical therapy clinics, outpatient clinics or offices, hospitals, health and wellness clinics, rehabilitation hospitals, skilled nursing facilities, extended care facilities, private homes, education and research centers, schools, hospices, industrial workplaces or other occupational environments, fitness centers and sports training facilities.

Physical therapists also practice in non-patient care roles such as health policy, health insurance, health care administration, and as health care executives. Physical therapists are involved in the medical-legal field serving as experts, performing peer review and independent medical examinations.

Education varies greatly by country. The span of education ranges from some countries having little formal education to others having doctoral degrees and post-doctoral residencies and fellowships.

Regarding its relationship to other healthcare professions, physiotherapy is typically one of the allied health professions. World Physiotherapy has signed a "memorandum of understanding" with the four other members of the World Health Professions Alliance "to enhance their joint collaboration on protecting and investing in the health workforce to provide safe, quality and equitable care in all settings".

== History ==
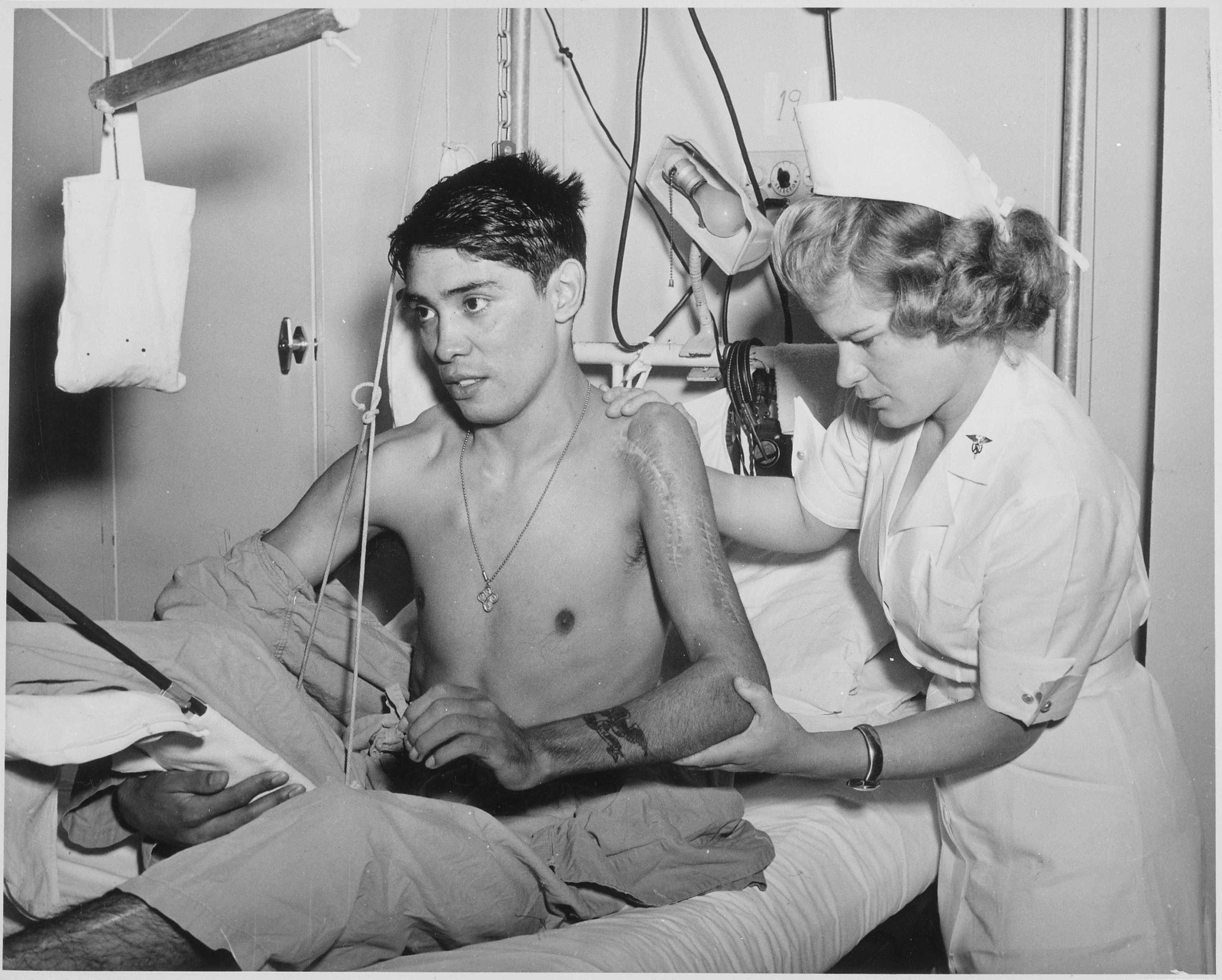
Exercising the shoulder and elbow to increase motion following the fracture and dislocation of the humerus is being given by an Army therapist to a soldier patient.

Physicians like Hippocrates and later Galen are believed to have been the first practitioners of physical therapy, advocating massage, manual therapy techniques and hydrotherapy to treat people in 460 BC.

In the book "De Arte Gymnastica" (The Art of Gymnastics, published in 1569), the Italian physician Hieronymus Mercurialis (1530–1606) introduced the term "medical gymnastics," highlighting one of the meanings of "gymnastics" as a dedicated rehabilitative tool for disabled subjects of any age.

The Italian physiologist and mathematician Alfonso Borelli (1608–1679) achieved significant scientific results in the field of animal and human biomechanics. His tractate "De Motu Animalium" (On the Movement of Animals), published in 1680, just after his death, provided a practical framework for understanding disordered and pathological movement patterns in ill and disabled people.

In the 18th century, the French physician Nicolas Andry de Bois-Regard (1658–1742) established a solid link between the health of the musculoskeletal apparatus and physical exercise, and in his book "Traité d'orthopédie" (Treatise on Orthopaedics, 1741), he introduced the new term "orthopaedics". After Nicolas Andry de Bois-Regard, this knowledge became fundamental for understanding correct exercises in physical rehabilitation. After the development of orthopedics in the eighteenth century, machines like the Gymnasticon were developed to treat gout and similar diseases by systematic exercise of the joints, similar to later developments in physical therapy.

The earliest documented origins of actual physical therapy as a professional group date back to Per Henrik Ling, the "Father of Swedish Gymnastics," who founded the Royal Central Institute of Gymnastics (RCIG) in 1813 for joint manipulation and exercise. Up until 2014, the Swedish word for a physical therapist was sjukgymnast, or someone involved in gymnastics for those who are ill, but the title was then changed to fysioterapeut (physiotherapist), the word used in the other Scandinavian countries. In 1887, PTs were given official registration by Sweden's National Board of Health and Welfare. Other countries soon followed. In 1894, four nurses in Great Britain formed the Chartered Society of Physiotherapy. Other early associations of physical therapists include the School of Physiotherapy at the University of Otago in New Zealand in 1913, and the United States 1914 Reed College in Portland, Oregon, which graduated "reconstruction aides." Since the profession's inception, spinal manipulative therapy has been a major component of the practice of physical therapy.

Modern physical therapy was established towards the end of the 19th century due to events that affected bodily health on a global scale, which called for rapid advances in physical therapy. Following this, American orthopedic surgeons began treating children with disabilities and employed women trained in physical education, and remedial exercise. These treatments were further applied and promoted during the polio outbreak of 1916.

During the First World War, women were recruited to work with and restore physical function to injured soldiers, and the field of physical therapy was institutionalized. In 1918 the term "Reconstruction Aide" was used to refer to individuals practicing physical therapy. The first school of physical therapy was established at Walter Reed Army Hospital in Washington, D.C., following the outbreak of World War I. Treatment through the 1940s primarily consisted of exercise, massage, and traction. Manipulative procedures to the spine and joints of the extremities began to be practiced, especially in the British Commonwealth countries, in the early 1950s.

Around the time polio vaccines were developed, the presence of physical therapists became normalized in hospitals throughout North America and Europe. In the late 1950s, physical therapists started to move beyond solely hospital-based practices to outpatient orthopedic clinics, public schools, college/university health centers, geriatric settings (skilled nursing facilities), rehabilitation centers and medical centers. The specialization of physical therapy in the U.S. occurred in 1974, with the Orthopaedic Section of the APTA being formed for those physical therapists specializing in orthopedics. In the same year, the International Federation of Orthopaedic Manipulative Physical Therapists was formed, which has ever since played an important role in advancing manual therapy worldwide.

An international organization for the profession is the World Confederation for Physical Therapy (WCPT). It was founded in 1951 and has operated under the brand name World Physiotherapy since 2020.

== Education ==
Educational criteria for physical therapy providers vary from state to state, country to country, and among various levels of professional responsibility. All U.S. states have physical therapy practice acts that recognize both physical therapists (PTs) and physical therapist assistants (PTAs), and some jurisdictions also recognize physical therapy technicians (PT techs) or aides. In many countries, physical therapists are required to obtain licensure or registration from the appropriate regulatory authority before they may practice independently, although the specific requirements vary by jurisdiction.

=== Canada ===
The Canadian Alliance of Physiotherapy Regulators (CAPR) permits eligible program graduates to apply for the national Physiotherapy Competency Examination (PCE). Passing the PCE is one of the requirements in most provinces and territories to work as a licensed physiotherapist in Canada. The members of CAPR are physiotherapy regulatory organizations recognized in their respective provinces and territories:

- Government of Yukon, Consumer Services
- College of Physical Therapists of British Columbia
- College of Physiotherapists of Alberta
- Saskatchewan College of Physical Therapists
- College of Physiotherapists of Manitoba
- College of Physiotherapists of Ontario
- Ordre professionnel de la physiothérapie du Québec
- College of Physiotherapists of New Brunswick/Collège des physiothérapeutes du Nouveau-Brunswick
- Nova Scotia College of Physiotherapists
- Prince Edward Island College of Physiotherapists
- Newfoundland & Labrador College of Physiotherapists

Physiotherapy programs are offered at fifteen universities, often through the university's respective college of medicine. Each of Canada's physical therapy schools has transitioned from three-year Bachelor of Science in Physical Therapy (BScPT) programs that required two years of prerequisite university courses (a five-year bachelor's degree) to two-year Master's of Physical Therapy (MPT) programs that require prerequisite bachelor's degrees. The last Canadian university to follow suit was the University of Manitoba, which transitioned to the MPT program in 2012, making the MPT credential the new standard entry to practice across Canada. Existing practitioners with BScPT credentials are not required to upgrade their qualifications.

In the province of Quebec, prospective physiotherapists are required to have completed a college diploma in either health sciences, which lasts on average two years, or physical rehabilitation technology, which lasts at least three years, to apply to a physiotherapy program or program in university. Following admission, physical therapy students work on a bachelor of science with a major in physical therapy and rehabilitation. The BSc usually requires three years to complete. Students must then enter graduate school to complete a master's degree in physical therapy, which normally requires one and a half to two years of study. Graduates who obtain their MSc must successfully pass the membership examination to become members of the Ordre Professionnel de la physiothérapie du Québec (OPPQ). Physiotherapists can pursue their education in such specialized fields as rehabilitation sciences, sports medicine, kinesiology, and physiology.

Quebec classifies physical rehabilitation therapists as health care professionals who are required to complete a four-year college diploma program in physical rehabilitation therapy and be members of the Ordre Professionnel de la physiothérapie du Québec (OPPQ) to practice legally in the country.

Most physical rehabilitation therapists complete their college diploma at Collège Montmorency, Dawson College, or Cégep Marie-Victorin, all situated in and around the Montreal area.

After completing their technical college diploma, graduates have the opportunity to pursue their studies at the university level to perhaps obtain a bachelor's degree in physiotherapy, kinesiology, Exercise Science, or occupational therapy. The Université de Montréal, the Université Laval and the Université de Sherbrooke are among the Québécois universities that admit physical rehabilitation therapists to programs of study related to health sciences and rehabilitation for credit courses that were completed in college.

To date, there are no bridging programs available to facilitate upgrading from the BScPT to the MPT credential. However, research Master's of Science (MSc) and Doctor of Philosophy (PhD) programs are available at every university. Aside from academic research, practitioners can upgrade their skills and qualifications through continuing education courses and curriculums. Continuing education is a requirement of the provincial regulatory bodies.

The Canadian Physiotherapy Association offers a curriculum of continuing education courses in orthopedics and manual therapy. The program consists of 5 levels (7 courses) of training with ongoing mentorship and evaluation at each level. The orthopedic curriculum and examinations take a minimum of 4 years to complete. However, upon completion of level 2, physiotherapists can apply to a unique 1-year course-based Master's program in advanced orthopedics and manipulation at the University of Western Ontario to complete their training. This program accepts only 16 physiotherapists annually since 2007. Successful completion of either of these education streams and their respective examinations allows physiotherapists the opportunity to apply to the Canadian Academy of Manipulative Physiotherapy (CAMPT) for fellowship. Fellows of the Canadian Academy of Manipulative Physiotherapists (FCAMPT) are considered leaders in the field, having extensive post-graduate education in orthopedics and manual therapy. FCAMPT is an internationally recognized credential, as CAMPT is a member of the International Federation of Manipulative Physiotherapists (IFOMPT), a branch of World Physiotherapy (formerly World Confederation of Physical Therapy (WCPT)) and the World Health Organization (WHO).

=== Scotland ===
Physiotherapy degrees are offered at four universities: Edinburgh Napier University in Edinburgh, Robert Gordon University in Aberdeen, Glasgow Caledonian University in Glasgow, and Queen Margaret University in Edinburgh. Students can qualify as physiotherapists by completing a four-year Bachelor of Science degree or a two-year master's degree (if they already have an undergraduate degree in a related field).

To use the title 'Physiotherapist', a student must register with the Health and Care Professions Council, a UK-wide regulatory body, on qualifying. Many physiotherapists are also members of the Chartered Society of Physiotherapy (CSP), which provides insurance and professional support.

=== United States ===
The primary practitioner of physical therapy practitioner is a physical therapist (PT) who is trained and licensed to examine, evaluate, diagnose and manage injury or disease in patients or clients. When indicated, physical therapists order diagnostic tests/studies, including but not limited to imaging and laboratory tests. Physical therapists may also perform or interpret selected imaging or other tests/studies. Physical therapist education curricula in the United States culminate in a Doctor of Physical Therapy (DPT) degree, with some practicing PTs holding a Master of Physical Therapy degree, and some with a Bachelor's degree. The Master of Physical Therapy and Master of Science in Physical Therapy degrees are no longer offered, and the entry-level degree is the Doctor of Physical Therapy degree, which typically takes 3 years after completing a bachelor's degree. PTs who hold a Master's or bachelor's in PT are encouraged to get their DPT because APTA's goal is for all PTs to be on a doctoral level. DPT programs in the United States are accredited by the Commission on Accreditation in Physical Therapy Education (CAPTE). According to CAPTE, as of 2025 there are 39,448 students currently enrolled in 322 accredited PT programs in the United States while 10,077 PTA students are currently enrolled in 390 PTA programs in the United States.

The physical therapist professional curriculum includes content in the clinical sciences (e.g., content about the cardiovascular, pulmonary, endocrine, metabolic, gastrointestinal, genitourinary, integumentary, musculoskeletal, and neuromuscular systems and the medical and surgical conditions frequently seen by physical therapists). Current training is specifically aimed to enable physical therapists to appropriately recognize and refer non-musculoskeletal diagnoses that may present similarly to those caused by systems not appropriate for physical therapy intervention, which has resulted in direct access to physical therapists in many states.

Post-doctoral residency and fellowship education prevalence is increasing steadily with 219 residency and 42 fellowship programs accredited in 2016. Residencies aim to train physical therapists in a specialty such as acute care, cardiovascular & pulmonary, clinical electrophysiology, faculty, geriatrics, neurology, orthopaedics, pediatrics, sports, women's health, and wound care, whereas fellowships train specialists in a subspecialty (e.g. critical care, hand therapy, and division 1 sports), similar to the medical model. Residency programs offer eligibility to sit for the specialist certification in their respective area of practice. For example, completion of an orthopedic physical therapy residency allows the graduates to apply and sit for the clinical specialist examination in orthopedics, achieving the OCS designation upon passing the examination. Board certification of physical therapy specialists is aimed to recognize individuals with advanced clinical knowledge and skill training in their respective area of practice, and exemplifies the trend toward greater education to optimally treat individuals with movement dysfunction.

Physical therapist assistants may deliver treatment and physical interventions for patients and clients under a care plan established by and under the supervision of a physical therapist. Physical therapist assistants in the United States are currently trained under associate of applied sciences curricula specific to the profession, as outlined and accredited by CAPTE. As of December 2022, there were 396 accredited two-year (associate degree) programs for physical therapist assistants in the United States of America.

== Employment ==
Physical therapy–related jobs in North America have shown rapid growth in recent years, but employment rates and average wages may vary significantly between different countries, states, provinces, or regions. A study from 2013 states that 56.4% of physical therapists were globally satisfied with their jobs. Salary, interest in work, and fulfillment in a job are important predictors of job satisfaction. In a Polish study, job burnout among physical therapists was manifested by increased emotional exhaustion and a decreased sense of personal achievement. Emotional exhaustion is significantly higher among physical therapists working with adults and employed in hospitals. Other factors that increased burnout include working in a hospital setting and having seniority from 15 to 19 years.

=== United States ===
According to the United States Department of Labor's Bureau of Labor Statistics, there were approximately 267,200 physical therapists employed in the United States in 2024, earning an average of $101,020 per year in 2024, or $48.57 per hour, with 11% growth in employment projected by 2034. The Bureau of Labor Statistics also reports that there were approximately 128,700 physical therapist assistants and aides employed in the United States in 2014, earning an average of $42,980 annually, or $20.66 per hour, with 40% growth in employment projected by 2024. To meet their needs, many healthcare and physical therapy facilities hire "travel physical therapists", who work temporary assignments between 8 and 26 weeks for much higher wages; about $113,500 a year." Bureau of Labor Statistics data on PTAs and techs can be difficult to decipher, due to their tendency to report data on these job fields collectively rather than separately. O-Net reports that in 2015, PTAs in the United States earned a median wage of $55,170 annually or $26.52 hourly and that aides/techs earned a median wage of $25,120 annually or $12.08 hourly in 2015. The American Physical Therapy Association reports vacancy rates for physical therapists as 11.2% in outpatient private practice, 10% in acute care settings, and 12.1% in skilled nursing facilities. The APTA also reports turnover rates for physical therapists as 10.7% in outpatient private practice, 11.9% in acute care settings, 27.6% in skilled nursing facilities.

Definitions and licensing requirements in the United States vary among jurisdictions, as each state has enacted its own physical therapy practice act defining the profession within its jurisdiction, but the Federation of State Boards of Physical Therapy has also drafted a model definition to limit this variation. The Commission on Accreditation in Physical Therapy Education (CAPTE) is responsible for accrediting physical therapy education curricula throughout the United States of America.

=== United Kingdom ===
The title of Physiotherapist is a protected professional title in the United Kingdom. Anyone using this title must be registered with the Health & Care Professions Council (HCPC). Physiotherapists must complete the necessary qualifications, usually an undergraduate physiotherapy degree (at university or as an intern), a master rehabilitation degree, or a doctoral degree in physiotherapy. This is typically followed by supervised professional experience lasting two to three years. All professionals on the HCPC register must comply with continuing professional development and can be audited for evidence of having done so at intervals.

== Specialty areas ==
The body of knowledge of physical therapy is large, and therefore physical therapists may specialize in a specific clinical area. While there are many different types of physical therapy, the American Board of Physical Therapy Specialties lists ten current specialist certifications. Most physical therapists practicing in a particular specialty will have undergone further training, such as an accredited residency program, although individuals are currently able to sit for their specialist examination after 2,000 hours of focused practice in their respective specialty population, in addition to requirements set by each respective specialty board.

=== Cardiovascular and pulmonary ===
Cardiovascular and pulmonary rehabilitation respiratory practitioners and physical therapists offer therapy for a wide variety of cardiopulmonary disorders or pre- and post-cardiac or pulmonary surgery. An example of cardiac surgery is coronary bypass surgery. The primary goals of this specialty include increasing endurance and functional independence. Manual therapy is used in this field to assist in clearing lung secretions experienced with cystic fibrosis. The treatment of pulmonary disorders, heart attacks, post coronary bypass surgery, chronic obstructive pulmonary disease, and pulmonary fibrosis can benefit from cardiovascular and pulmonary specialized physical therapists.

=== Clinical electrophysiology ===
This specialty area includes electrotherapy/physical agents, electrophysiological evaluation (EMG/NCV), physical agents, and wound management.

=== Geriatric ===
Geriatric physical therapy covers a wide area of issues concerning people as they go through normal adult aging but is usually focused on the older adult. There are many conditions that affect many people as they grow older and include but are not limited to the following: arthritis, osteoporosis, cancer, Alzheimer's disease, hip and joint replacement, balance disorders, and incontinence. Geriatric physical therapists specialize in providing therapy for such conditions in older adults.

Physical rehabilitation can prevent deterioration in the health and activities of daily living among care home residents. The current evidence suggests benefits to physical health from participating in different types of physical rehabilitation to improve daily living, strength, flexibility, balance, mood, memory, exercise tolerance, fear of falling, injuries, and death. It may be both safe and effective in improving physical and possibly mental state, while reducing disability with few adverse events.

The current body of evidence suggests that physical rehabilitation may be effective for long-term care residents in reducing disability with few adverse events. However, there is insufficient to conclude whether the beneficial effects are sustainable and cost-effective. The findings are based on moderate quality evidence.

=== Wound management ===
Wound management physical therapy includes the treatment of conditions involving the skin and all its related organs. Common conditions managed include wounds and burns. Physical therapists may use surgical instruments, wound irrigations, dressings, and topical agents to remove the damaged or contaminated tissue and promote tissue healing. Other commonly used interventions include exercise, edema control, splinting, and compression garments. The work done by physical therapists in the integumentary specialty is similar to what would be done by medical doctors or nurses in the emergency room or triage.

=== Neurology ===
Neurological physical therapy is a field focused on working with individuals who have a neurological disorder or disease. These can include a stroke, chronic back pain, Alzheimer's disease, Charcot-Marie-Tooth disease (CMT), ALS, brain injury, cerebral palsy, multiple sclerosis, Parkinson's disease, facial palsy and spinal cord injury. Common impairments associated with neurologic conditions include impairments of vision, balance, ambulation, activities of daily living, movement, muscle strength and loss of functional independence. The techniques involve in neurological physical therapy are wide-ranging and often require specialized training.

Neurological physiotherapy is also called neurophysiotherapy or neurological rehabilitation. It is recommended for neurophysiotherapists to collaborate with psychologists when providing physical treatment of movement disorders. This is especially important because combining physical therapy and psychotherapy can improve neurological status of the patients.

=== Orthopaedics ===
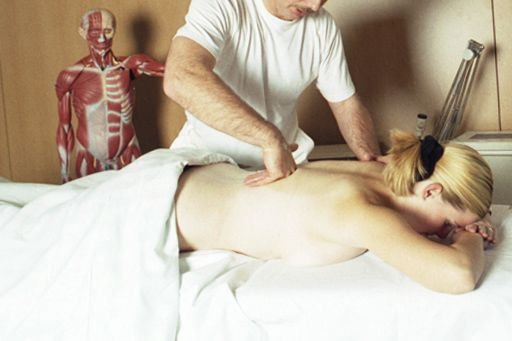
Treatment by an orthopedic physical therapist

Orthopedic physical therapists diagnose, manage, and treat disorders and injuries of the musculoskeletal system, including rehabilitation after orthopedic surgery, acute trauma such as sprains or strains, and injuries of insidious onset such as tendinopathy, bursitis, and deformities like scoliosis. This specialty of physical therapy is most often found in the outpatient clinical setting. Orthopedic therapists are trained in the treatment of post-operative orthopedic procedures, fractures, acute sports injuries, arthritis, sprains, strains, back and neck pain, spinal conditions, and amputations.

Joint and spine therapies (e.g. mobilization, manipulation and centration), dry needling (similar to acupuncture), therapeutic exercise, neuromuscular techniques, muscle reeducation, hot/cold packs, and electrical muscle stimulation (e.g., cryotherapy, iontophoresis, electrotherapy) are modalities employed to expedite recovery in the orthopedic setting. Additionally, an emerging adjunct to diagnosis and treatment is the use of sonography for diagnosis and to guide treatments such as muscle retraining. Those with injury or disease affecting the muscles, bones, ligaments, or tendons will benefit from assessment by a physical therapist specialized in orthopedics.

=== Pediatrics ===
Pediatric physical therapy assists in the early detection of health problems and uses a variety of modalities to provide physical therapy for disorders in the pediatric population. These therapists are specialized in the diagnosis, treatment, and management of infants, children, and adolescents with a variety of congenital, developmental, neuromuscular, skeletal, or acquired disorders/diseases. Treatments focus mainly on improving gross and fine motor skills, balance and coordination, strength and endurance as well as cognitive and sensory processing/integration.

=== Sports ===
Physical therapists are closely involved in the care and wellbeing of athletes, including recreational, semi-professional (paid), and professional (full-time employment) participants. Sports injuries can be anything from minor problems like sprains and strains to more serious ones like joint instability or tendinitis. The ideal physical treatment for sports injuries is quite specific and is determined by the athlete's history, recovery objectives, and the kind and severity of the injury. This area of practice encompasses athletic injury management under 5 main categories:

1. Acute care – assessment and diagnosis of an initial injury;
2. Treatment – application of specialist advice and techniques to encourage healing;
3. Rehabilitation – progressive management for full return to sport;
4. Prevention – identification and address of deficiencies known to directly result in, or act as precursors to injury, such as movement assessment
5. Education – sharing of specialist knowledge with individual athletes, teams, or clubs to assist in prevention or management of injury

Physical therapists who work for professional sports teams often have a specialized sports certification issued through their national registering organization. Most physical therapists who practice in a sporting environment are also active in collaborative sports medicine programs (see also athletic trainers).

=== Women's health ===
Women's health and pelvic floor physical therapy mostly address women's issues related to the female reproductive system, child birth, and post-partum. These conditions include lymphedema, osteoporosis, pelvic pain, prenatal and post-partum periods, and urinary incontinence. It also addresses pelvic pain, pelvic organ prolapse and other disorders associated with pelvic floor dysfunction. Manual physical therapy has been demonstrated in multiple studies to increase rates of conception in women with infertility.

=== Oncology ===
Physical therapy in the field of oncology and palliative care is a continuously evolving and developing specialty, both in malignant and non-malignant diseases. Physical therapy for both groups of patients is now recognized as an essential part of the clinical pathway, as early diagnoses and new treatments are enabling patients to live longer. it is generally accepted that patients should have access to an appropriate level of rehabilitation, so that they can function at a minimum level of dependency and optimize their quality of life, regardless of their life expectancy.

=== Musculoskeletal and point-of-care sonography ===
Physical therapists may be credentialed by the APCA in musculoskeletal and point-of-care sonography as sonologists performing and interpreting ultrasound examinations.

== Physical therapist–patient collaborative relationship ==
People with brain injuries, musculoskeletal conditions, cardiac conditions, or multiple pathologies benefit from a positive alliance between patient and therapist. Outcomes include the ability to successfully perform activities of daily living, manage pain, complete specific physical function tasks, depression, global assessment of physical health, treatment adherence, and treatment satisfaction.

Studies have explored four themes that may influence patient-therapist interactions: interpersonal and communication skills, practical skills, individualized patient-centered care, and organizational and environmental factors. Physical therapists need to be able to effectively communicate with their patients on a variety of levels. Patients have varying levels of health literacy, which must be taken into account when discussing the patient's ailments as well as planned treatments. Research has shown that using communication tools tailored to the patient's health literacy leads to improved engagement with their practitioner and their clinical care. In addition, patients reported that shared decision-making will yield a positive relationship. Practical skills, such as the ability to educate patients about their conditions as well as professional expertise, are perceived as valuable factors in inpatient care. Patients value the ability of a clinician to provide clear and simple explanations about their problems. Furthermore, patients value when physical therapists possess excellent technical skills that improve the patient's condition effectively.

Environmental factors such as the location, equipment used, and parking are less important to the patient than the clinical encounter with the therapist itself.

Based on the current understanding, the most important factors that contribute to the patient-therapist interactions include that the physical therapist spends an adequate amount of time with the patient, possesses strong listening and communication skills, treats the patient with respect, provides clear explanations of the treatment, and allows the patient to be involved in the treatment decisions.

== Effectiveness ==
Physical therapy has been found to be effective for improving outcomes, both in terms of pain and function, in multiple musculoskeletal conditions. Spinal manipulation by physical therapists is a safe option to improve outcomes for lower back pain. Several studies have suggested that physical therapy, particularly manual therapy techniques focused on the neck and the median nerve, combined with stretching exercises, may be equivalent or even preferable to surgery for carpal tunnel syndrome. While spine manipulation and therapeutic massage are effective interventions for neck pain, electroacupuncture, strain-counterstrain, relaxation massage, heat therapy, and ultrasound therapy are not as effective, and thus not recommended.

Studies also show physical therapy is effective for patients with other conditions. Physiotherapy treatment may improve quality of life, promote cardiopulmonary fitness and inspiratory pressure, as well as reduce symptoms and medication use by people with asthma. Physical therapy is provided to patients in the ICU, as early mobilization can help reduce ICU and hospital length of stay and improve long-term functional ability. Early progressive mobilization for adult, intubated ICU patients on mechanical ventilation is safe and effective.

Psychologically informed physical therapy (PIPT), in which a physical therapist treats patients while other members of a multidisciplinary care team help in preoperative planning for patient management of pain and quality of life, helps improve patient outcomes, especially before and after spine, hip, or knee surgery.

However, in the United States, there are obstacles affecting the effectiveness of physical therapy, such as racial disparities among patients. Studies have shown that non-white and Hispanic patients may receive lower standards of care compared to white patients. Hispanic patients in particular were found to have difficulties receiving a physician referral for an appointment despite sufficient insurance coverage. Raising awareness of these racial disparities in physical therapy is crucial to improving treatment effectiveness across all demographics.

== Telehealth ==
Telehealth (or telerehabilitation) is a developing form of physical therapy in response to the increasing demand for physical therapy treatment. Telehealth is online communication between the clinician and patient, either live or in pre-recorded sessions. It receives mixed reviews when compared to usual, in-person care. The benefits of telehealth include improved accessibility in remote areas, cost efficiency, and improved convenience for people who are bedridden and home-restricted, or physically disabled. Some downsides of telehealth include: limited evidence for greater effectiveness and compliance than in-person therapy, licensing and payment policy issues, and compromised privacy. Studies are controversial as to the effectiveness of telehealth in patients with more serious conditions, such as a stroke, multiple sclerosis, and lower back pain. In the United States, the interstate compact, enacted in March 2018, allows patients to participate in telehealth appointments with medical practices located in different states.

During the COVID-19 pandemic, the need for telehealth came to the fore as patients were less able to safely attend in-person, particularly if they were elderly or had chronic diseases. Telehealth was considered to be a proactive step to prevent physical decline in individuals that could not attend classes. Physical decline in at-risk groups is difficult to address or undo later. The platform licensing or development are found to be the most substantial cost in telehealth. Telehealth does not remove the need for the physical therapist as they still need to oversee the program.

== See also ==
- American Board of Physical Therapy Specialties
- American Physical Therapy Association
- Basic body-awareness methodology
- Chiropractic
- Doctor (title)
- Doctor of Physical Therapy
- Exercise physiology
- Exercise prescription
- Neurophysiotherapy
- Occupational therapy
- Physical medicine and rehabilitation
- Postural Restoration
- Sekkotsu
- Sports medicine
- Therapy
- World Physiotherapy
