= Posterior cruciate ligament injury =

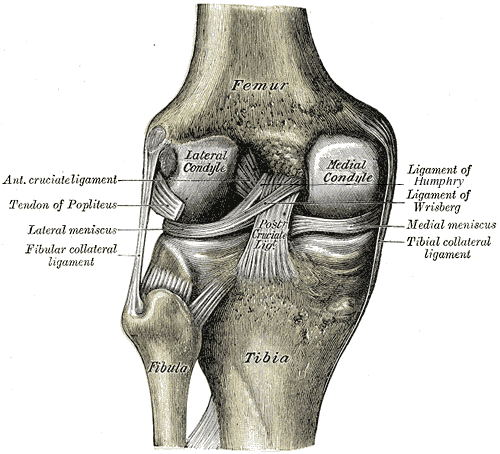
- Posterior cruciate ligament (center)
- Specialty: Orthopedic surgery

The function of the posterior cruciate ligament (PCL) is to prevent the femur from sliding off the anterior edge of the tibia and to prevent the tibia from displacing posterior to the femur. Common causes of PCL injuries are direct blows to the flexed knee, such as the knee hitting the dashboard in a car accident or falling hard on the knee, both instances displacing the tibia posterior to the femur.

Surgery to repair the posterior cruciate ligament is controversial due to its placement and technical difficulty.

The posterior drawer test is one of the tests used by doctors and physiotherapists to detect injury to the PCL. An additional test of posterior cruciate ligament injury is the posterior sag test, where, in contrast to the drawer test, no active force is applied. Rather, the person lies supine with the leg held by another person so that the hip is flexed to 90 degrees and the knee 90 degrees. The main parameter in this test is step-off, which is the shortest distance from the femur to a hypothetical line that tangents the surface of the tibia from the tibial tuberosity and upwards. Normally, the step-off is approximately 1 cm, but is decreased (Grade I) or even absent (Grade II) or inverse (Grade III) in injuries to the posterior cruciate ligament.

Patients who are suspected to have a posterior cruciate ligament injury should always be evaluated for other knee injuries that often occur in combination with an PCL injuries. These include cartilage/meniscus injuries, bone bruises, ACL tears, fractures, posterolateral injuries and collateral ligament injuries.

== Cause ==
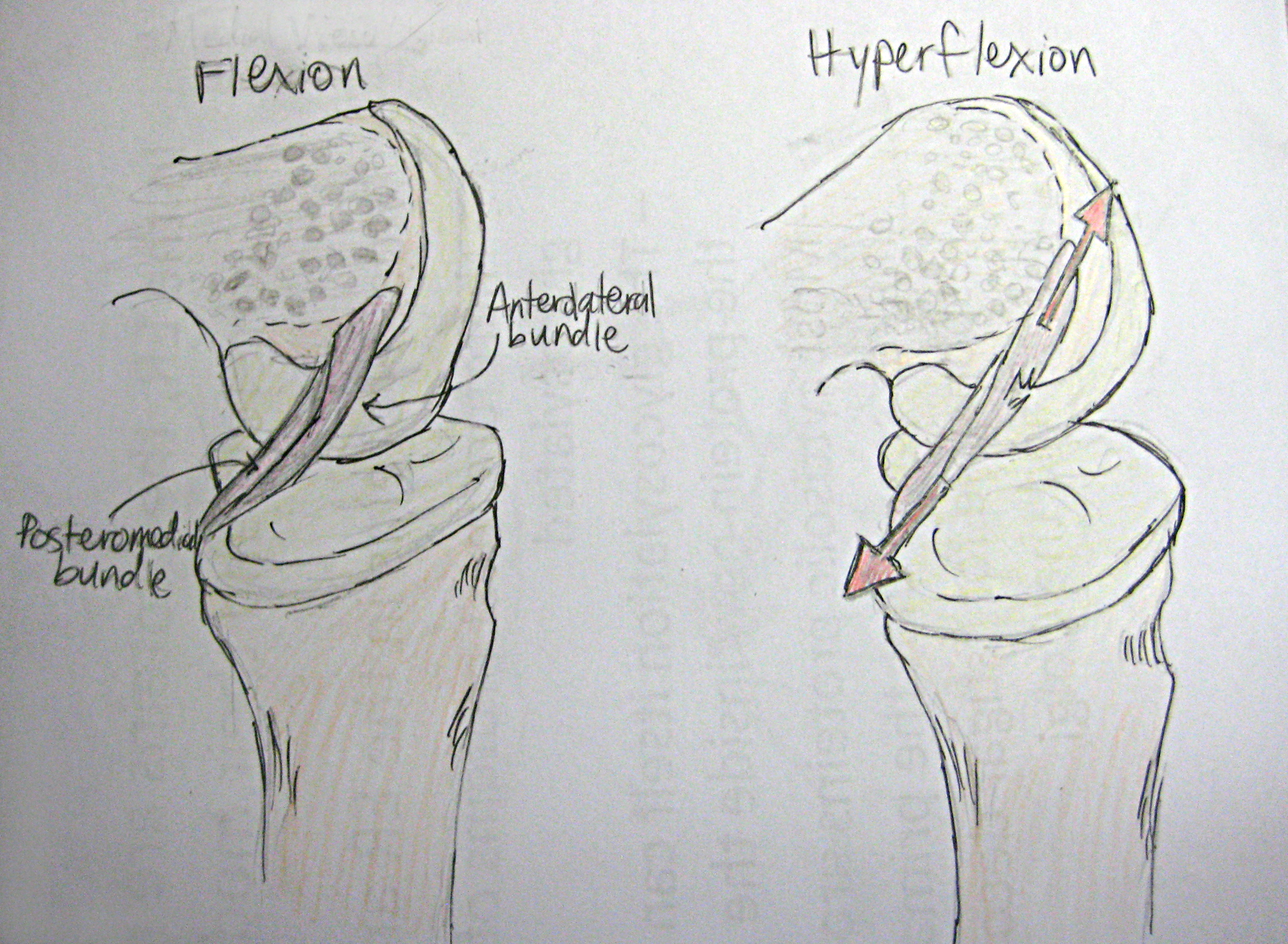
In this medial view of the flexed knee, the lateral femoral condyle has been removed to reveal the structure of the PCL. Because the anterolateral bundle is stretched and the posteromedial bundle relaxed during flexion, excessive flexion in the form of hyperflexion causes tensile stress, shown in red, on the anterolateral bundle of the PCL that leads to PCL injury.

=== Related anatomy ===
The PCL is located within the knee joint where it stabilizes the articulating bones, particularly the femur and the tibia, during movement. It originates from the lateral edge of the medial femoral condyle and the roof of the intercondyle notch then stretches, at a posterior and lateral angle, toward the posterior of the tibia just below its articular surface.

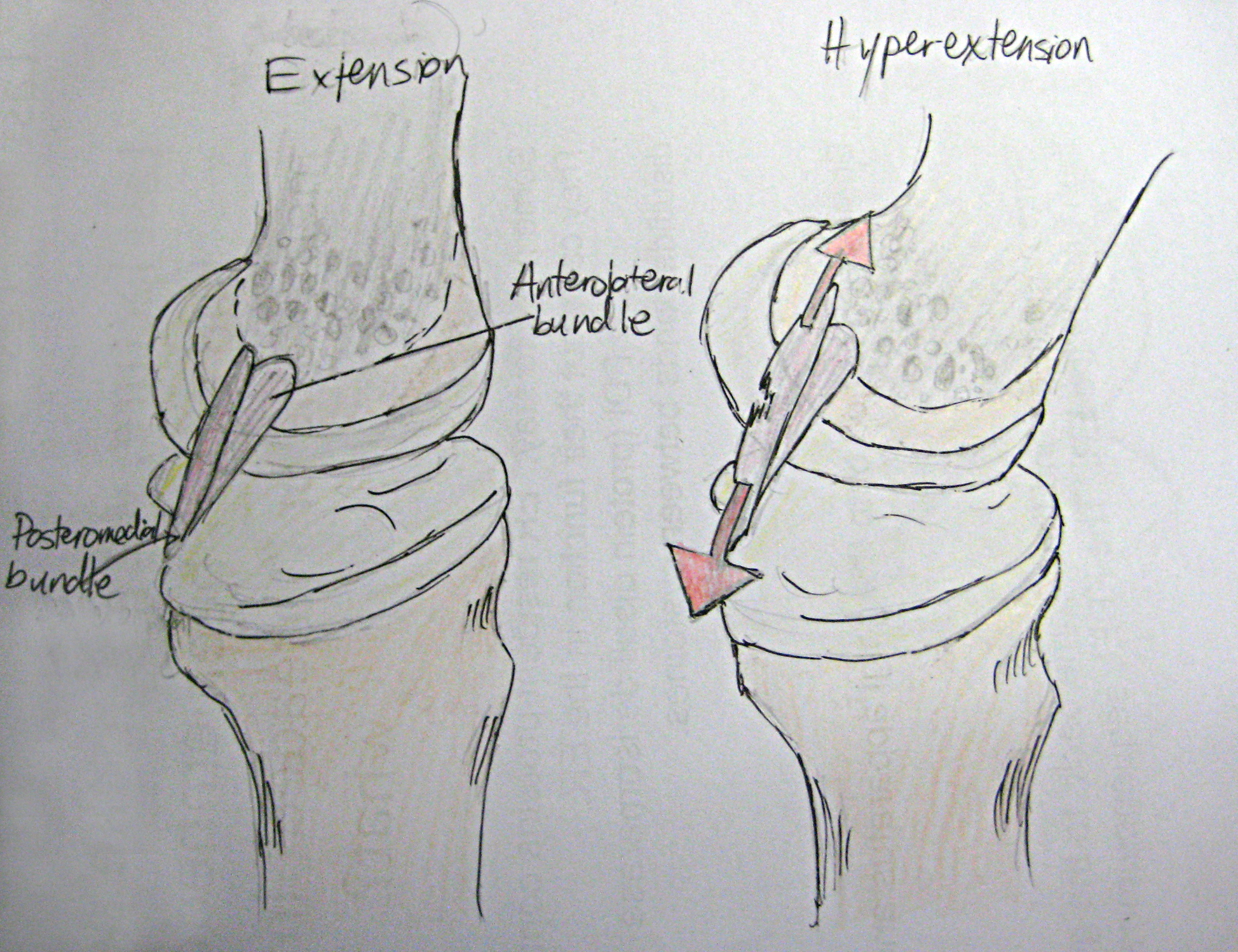
In this medial view of the extended knee, the lateral femoral condyle has been removed to reveal the structure of the PCL. Because the posteromedial bundle is stretched and the anterolateral bundle relaxed during extension, excessive extension in the form of hyperextension causes tensile stress, shown in red, on the posteromedial bundle of the PCL that leads to PCL injury.

=== Related physiological features ===
Although each PCL is a unified unit, they are described as separate anterolateral and posteromedial sections based on each section's attachment site and function. During knee joint movement, the PCL rotates such that the anterolateral section stretches in knee flexion but not in knee extension and the posteromedial bundle stretches in extension rather than flexion.

=== The types of mechanisms that lead to PCL injury ===
In this position, the PCL functions to prevent movement of the tibia in the posterior direction and to prevent the tilting or shifting of the patella. However, the respective laxity of the two sections makes the PCL susceptible to injury during hyperflexion, hyperextension, and in a mechanism known as a dashboard injury. Because ligaments are viscoelastic (p. 50) they can handle higher amounts of stress only when the load is increased slowly (p. 30). When hyperflexion and hyperextension occur suddenly in combination with this viscoelastic behavior, the PCL deforms or tears. In the third and most common mechanism, the dashboard injury mechanism, the knee experiences impact in a posterior direction during knee flexion toward the space above the tibia. These mechanisms occur in excessive external tibial rotation and during falls that induce a combination of extension and adduction of the tibia, which is referred to as varus-extension stress, or that occur while the knee is flexed.

== Prevention ==
=== Knee injury ===
Knee injuries are very common among athletes as well as regular active people and can always be prevented. Ligament tears account for more than forty percent of knee injuries and the posterior cruciate ligament is considered one of the less common injuries. Although it is less common, there are still important measures that can be taken in order to prevent this type of knee injury. Maintaining proper exercise and sport technique is crucial for injury prevention, which include not exceeding the body or not going over the proper range of motion of the knee, properly warming up and cooling down

=== Quadriceps-to-Hamstring Strength Ratio ===
Another important aspect of maintaining injury-free knees is having a sufficient hamstrings-to-quadriceps strength ratio because they help stabilize the knees. The ratio is a measure of the relative strength of the hamstrings compared to the quadriceps. This means having a 50% H/Q ratio equates to your hamstrings being half as strong as your quadriceps, while a 100% ratio means that your hamstrings and quadriceps are equally as strong.

Generally the higher one's H/Q ratio, the better the hamstrings can help the ACL resist dangerous forces during sudden movements and in sports, while a low H/Q ratio is associated with a higher degree of knee injury. According to Sports Performance Bulletin, a 50% ratio is enough for "daily living activities", but the ratio needs to be higher near 80% for athletic activity, while for ACL injury prevention, the ratio should ideally be closer to a balanced 1.0 (100%).

Exercises that primarily activates the quadriceps can increase "shearing-type" forces on the knee joint. This is why strong hamstrings are necessary to support the ACL by preventing the shin bone shifting forward as the knee straightens. When the H/Q ratio is low, meaning the hamstrings are relatively weak, certain exercises can help improve the ratio. These include Romanian deadlift, Nordic hamstring curls, Swiss ball hamstring curls, leg curls, leg lifts, prone knee flexion with resistance band, knee extensions, side stepping with an elastic band around the knees, and side and forward hop exercises.

Some stretches to help prevent injury to the posterior cruciate ligament include stretching of the hamstring muscles by extending the legs, toes pointing up, leaning forward until the stretch is felt and holding for a few seconds.

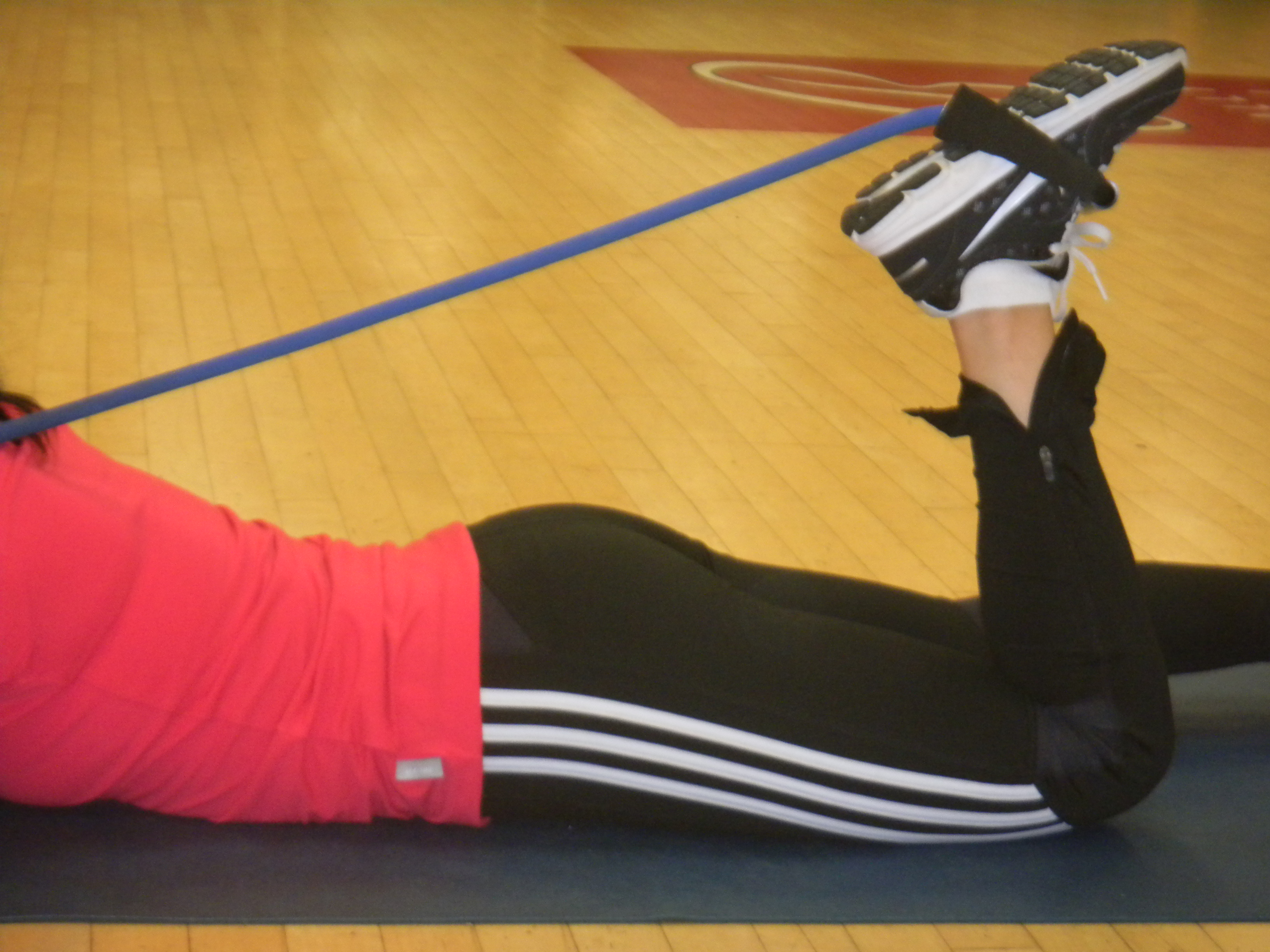
Exercises that strengthen the knee joints and the hamstrings include prone knee flexion. Where the knee flexes all the way back to the rear end, hold for about 10 seconds, then slowly lower to original position and repeat.

=== Exercises and stretches ===
Following a knee injury particularly during early stages of rehabilitation, it is vital to have exercises that simultaneously activates both the quadriceps and hamstrings in what is commonly referred to as co-contraction. This aids in encouraging better hamstring and quadriceps muscle control for the later stages of rehabilitation.

When an exercise involves the foot remaining in contact with a fixed surface, it is referred to as "closed kinetic chain" exercises. When these exercises engage multiple joints and muscles simultaneously, they are effective in improving muscle balance around the knee. Gym machine exercises like seated leg curls and leg extension are what are referred to as "open kinetic chain" exercises, which means the foot isn't engaged with a fixed surface. While these exercises can be used to assess one's H/Q ratio, they are not effective in promoting co-contraction of both the hamstrings and quadriceps. A useful tip for co-contraction exercises is to keep your heels firmly on the floor, rather than shifting weight onto the toes, to avoid disproportionately increasing activation of quadriceps and to support a more balanced hamstrings-to-quadriceps (H/Q) ratio.

In addition, balancing exercises have also been adopted because it has been proven that people with poor balance have more knee injuries than those with good balance. Wobble boards and Bosu balls are very common pieces of equipment used to balance and help prevent knee injuries as long as they are being used with trained personnel. Another possible preventive measure is wearing knee straps to help stabilize the knee and protect it from injury, especially during demanding sports such as football.

== Treatment ==
It is possible for the PCL to heal on its own. Surgery is usually required in complete tears of the ligament. Surgery usually takes place after a few weeks, in order to allow swelling to decrease and regular motion to return to the knee. A procedure called ligament reconstruction is used to replace the torn PCL with a new ligament, which is usually a graft taken from the hamstring or Achilles tendon from a host cadaver. An arthroscope allows a complete evaluation of the entire knee joint, including the knee cap (patella), the cartilage surfaces, the meniscus, the ligaments (ACL & PCL), and the joint lining. Then, the new ligament is attached to the bone of the thigh and lower leg with screws to hold it in place. PCL repair can also be undertaken. This differs from PCL reconstruction because a graft is not needed and the native PCL is reattached.

== Rehabilitation ==
=== Grades of injury ===
The posterior cruciate ligament is located within the knee. Ligaments are sturdy bands of tissues that connect bones. Similar to the anterior cruciate ligament, the PCL connects the femur to the tibia. There are four different grades of classification in which medical doctor's classify a PCL injury: Grade I, the PCL has a slight tear. Grade II, the PCL ligament is minimally torn and becomes loose. Grade III, the PCL is torn completely and the knee can now be categorized as unstable. Grade IV, the ligament is damaged along with another ligament housed in the knee e.g. ACL or posteromedial corner. With these grades of PCL injuries, there are different treatments available for such injuries.

=== Rehabilitation options ===
It is possible for the PCL to heal on its own without surgery when it is in Grades I and II. PCL injuries that are diagnosed in these categories can have their recovery times reduced by performing certain rehabilitative exercises. Fernandez and Pugh(2012) found that following a PCL grade II diagnosis, a multimodal treatment that spanned over the course of 8 weeks consisting of chiropractic lumbopelvic manipulation, physiotherapy, and implementing an exercise program that emphasized in eccentric muscle contraction (lunges, 1-leg squats, and trunk stabilization) which proved to be an effective way to recover from the PCL injury. For Grades III and IV, operative surgery is recommended or is usually needed. Grafts is the method when addressing PCL injuries that are in need of operative surgery. With grafts, there are different methods such as the tibial inlay or tunnel method.

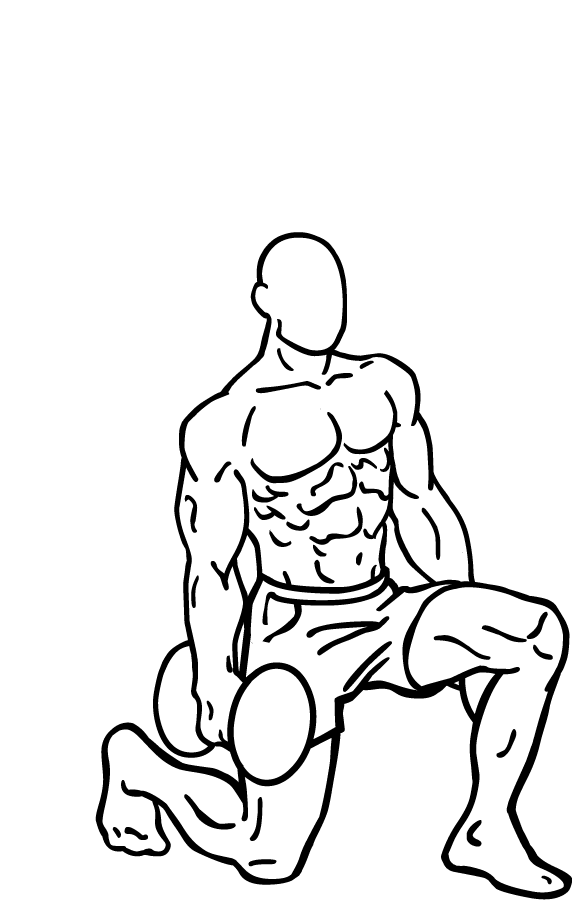
This picture shows the rehabilitative exercise called a "lunge" used to treat and strengthen PCL injuries.

== Epidemiology ==
=== Percentage of PCL to other knee injuries ===
According to the posterior cruciate ligament injuries only account for 1.5 percent of all knee injuries (figure 2). If it is a single injury to the posterior cruciate ligament that requires surgery only accounted for 1.1 percent compared to all other cruciate surgeries but when there was multiple injuries to the knee the posterior cruciate ligament accounted for 1.2 percent of injuries.

=== National statistics ===
In 2010 national statistics was done by Agency for Healthcare Research and Quality for posterior cruciate ligaments injuries. They found that 463 patients were discharge for having some type of PCL injury. The 18- to 44-year-old age group was found to have the highest injuries reported (figure 1). One reason why this age group consists of the majority of injuries to the PCL is because people are still very active in sports at this age. Men were also reported having more injuries to the PCL (figure 3).

=== Recommendation for surgery ===
A grade III PCL injury with more than 10mm posterior translation when the posterior drawer examination is performed may be treated surgically. Patients that do not improve stability during physical therapy or develop an increase in pain will be recommended for surgery.
