= Lewis Katz School of Medicine =

Public medical school in Philadelphia, Pennsylvania, US

- Type: State-related
- Established: 1901
- Faculty: 465
- Students: 880 MD
- Location: Philadelphia, Pennsylvania, U.S. 40.005°N 75.152°W
- Campus: Urban
- Dean: Amy J. Goldberg, MD, FACS
- Website: medicine.temple.edu

The Lewis Katz School of Medicine (LKSOM) is located on the Health Science Campus of Temple University in Philadelphia, Pennsylvania. It is one of seven schools of medicine in Pennsylvania that confers the Doctor of Medicine (MD) degree. It also confers Ph.D and M.S. degrees in biomedical science, and offers a Narrative Medicine program.

In July 2014, Lewis Katz School of Medicine's scientists became the first to remove HIV from human cells. As of 2015, Temple University's Fox Chase Cancer Center is ranked the ninth-best hospital for adult cancer by U.S. News & World Report. In 2024, LKSOM received 12,939 applications for a class of 221 students, ranking eighth in number of applicants among the 158 MD schools in the United States.

== History ==
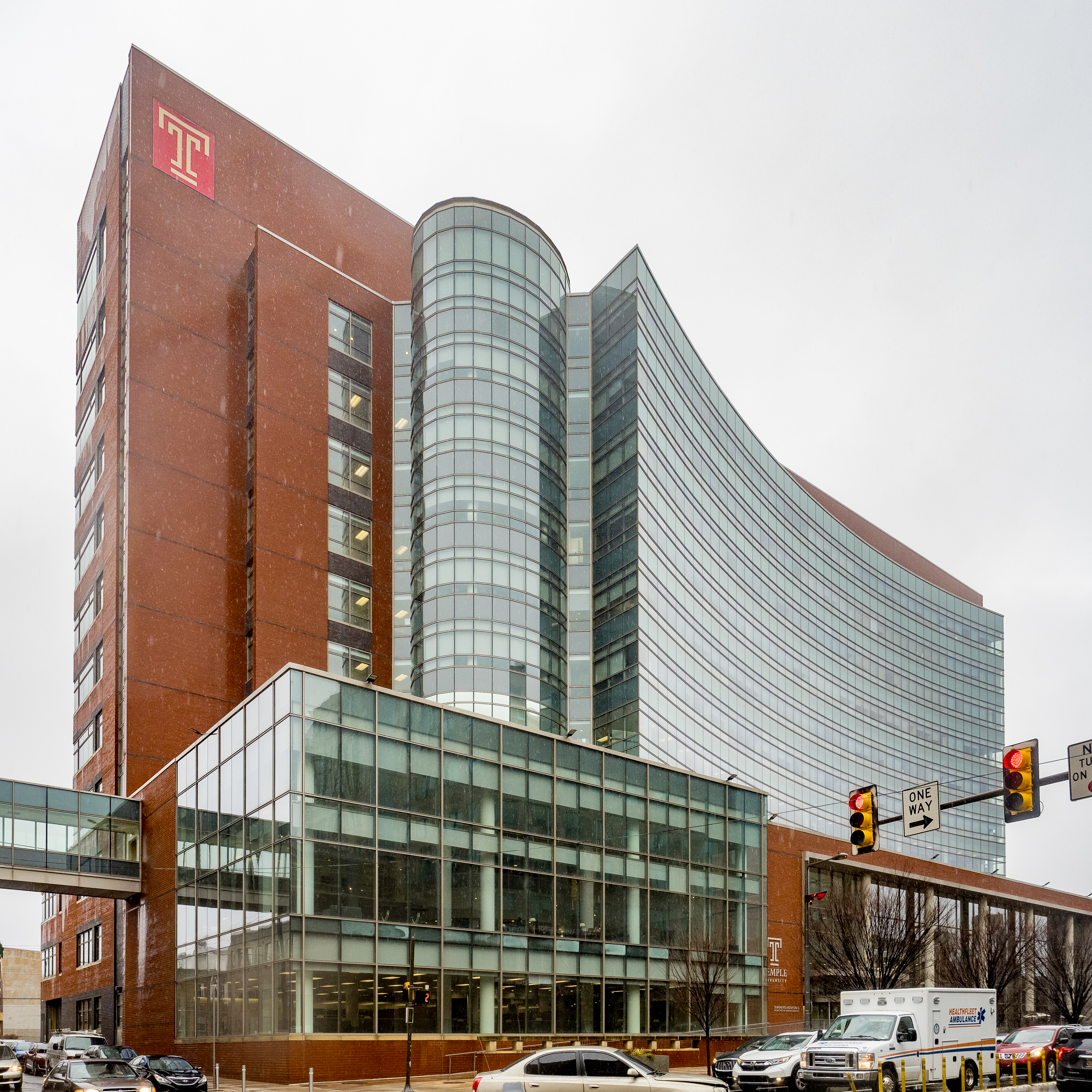
(2024)

Founded as Pennsylvania's first co-educational medical school, Temple Medical School was founded in 1901. Like the rest of the university at the time, classes were held on evenings and weekends. The curriculum that took five years to complete. In 1907, to meet state credentialing requirements, the medical school became a day program. Temple University's founder, Russell Conwell, opened a hospital with the Grace Baptist Church of Philadelphia in 1892 called the Samaritan Hospital on Broad and Ontario Streets, now the site of the Health Sciences Campus.

The institution has attained a national reputation for training humanistic and dedicated clinicians. The school was founded with the central principle that quality education should be afforded to everyone regardless of their ability to pay. In addition, the school has emphasized the development of humanitarianism; a value highlighted by Sir William Osler's quote, "The good physician treats the disease; the great physician treats the patient who has the disease." This quote is inscribed on one of the walls in the Medical Education and Research Building.

=== Revitalization and reconstruction ===
Under the leadership of Dean John Daly, M.D., alumnus of the class of 1973, LKSOM underwent revitalization. The institution hired 262 new professors in 4 years; added clinical and basic science departments; and completely revamped the medical curriculum to meet changing educational paradigms.

Additionally, on November 1, 2007, LKSOM broke ground on a new home: the Medical Education Research Building (MERB). At a projected cost of $160 million, the project was the largest capital improvement project in the history of Temple University at the time. The new building, an 11-story, glass and brick structure designed by Philadelphia-based architecture and engineering firm Ballinger, opened in May 2009. Notable features include a modern anatomy laboratory with computers and high definition LCD screens on articulating arms; a fully interactive patient simulation center with simulated doctor offices, emergency medicine department, and surgical apparatuses as well as a staff of simulated patient actors, simulated patient mannequins, and full-time instructing physicians; and a 24-hour, 50,000 square-foot library with individualized study rooms containing high definition televisions with multimedia and wireless accessibility.

The Medical Education Research Building also features a wide array of attributes designed to lower stress of its faculty, staff, and students. Examples include a classical grand piano on the third floor; a medical student lounge with cable, high definition television; and a three-story atrium/commons area containing armchairs and medical art.

== Educational programs ==
- MD Program
- PhD/MS in Biomedical Sciences
- MA in Urban Bioethics
- MD/PhD
- MD/MA in Urban Bioethics
- MD/MBA
- Narrative Medicine Program
  - On December 7, 2019, LKSOM hosted its first inaugural Narrative Medicine Conference. The conference featured presentations on Theater of Witness by Megan Voeller (Tangles in Time), photography by Dr. John Hansen-Flaschen, and a life of narratives in medicine by Dr. Amy Goldberg and Dr. Steven Rosenberg. Workshops included reflective writing, poetry, dance, photography, drawing, improv theater, fiction writing and reimagining the patient chart.
- Physician Assistant Program
- Advanced Core in Medical Sciences (ACMS) Postbaccalaureate Program

== Medical curriculum ==
The education of medical students at Temple University School of Medicine includes a foundation in the fundamentals of basic and clinical science. The first two years are taught in an integrated approach, closely tying basic science concepts to clinical medicine, professionalism and medical ethics. The clinical years are marked by hands-on experience in caring for patients. The William Maul Measey Institute for Clinical Simulation and Patient Safety allows students to learn basic clinical skills and teamwork in a safe learning environment throughout the curriculum.

=== Year 1 ===
The major goal of Year 1 is understanding normal human structure, function, and development. The first year is divided into seven blocks:

- Fundamentals 1: Human Structure
- Fundamentals 2: Cellular Function
- Fundamentals 3: Host Defenses and Threats
- Fundamentals 4: Basis of Disease and Treatment
- Systems 1: Neuroscience and Psychiatry
- Systems 2: Cardiovascular Medicine
- Systems 3: Nephrology

A doctoring course running throughout the preclinical curriculum enables students to learn the basics of history-taking, physical exam skills, and professionalism. The course uses clinical cases to integrate the teaching and evaluation of clinical skills with the basic science concepts in each of the blocks. Students learn these skills with the help of clinician preceptors who provide individualized real-time observational feedback as well as longitudinal mentoring and career advising.

=== Year 2 ===
Year 2 focuses on the causes, mechanisms, identification and treatment of major human diseases. The second year is divided into 5 blocks:

- Microbiology and Infectious Diseases
- Diseases of the Cardiovascular and Respiratory Systems
- Diseases of the Renal, Endocrine and Reproductive Systems
- Diseases of the Central Nervous and Musculoskeletal Systems
- Diseases of the Gastrointestinal System, Hematology and Oncology

The Doctoring 2 course enables students to practice and improve their clinical skills and professionalism through closely supervised rotations in both ambulatory and hospital settings.

=== Year 3 ===
During Year 3, beginning in mid-May of the second year, students rotate through core clerkships in:

- Family Medicine
- Internal Medicine
- Neurology
- Obstetrics and Gynecology
- Pediatrics
- Psychiatry
- Surgery
- Elective (clinical, research or academic)

The third year Doctoring course emphasizes career advising, evidence-based medicine, professionalism and clinical decision-making.

=== Year 4 ===
In Year 4, beginning in May of the third year, students focus on areas of interest through a large variety of electives. They are required to do a sub-internship in either pediatrics, surgery, or medicine, as well as rotations in an intensive-care unit, the emergency department, and radiology. The balance of the fourth year is given over to electives, research, and residency interviews. Available electives include multiple medical and surgical sub-specialties. Students interested in specialties like obstetrics or neurology may also elect to do a second sub-internship in these specialties.

== Clinical campuses ==
Temple offers opportunities to perform third and fourth year rotations at a number of Pennsylvania-based clinical campuses.

- Abington Memorial Hospital, Abington
- Allegheny Health Network, Pittsburgh
- Conemaugh Memorial Medical Center, Johnstown
- Crozer-Chester Medical Center, Upland
- Fox Chase Cancer Center, Philadelphia
- Geisinger Medical Center, Danville
- Lehigh Valley Hospital–Cedar Crest, Allentown
- Mercy Hospital, Scranton
- Reading Hospital and Medical Center, Reading
- St. Christopher's Hospital for Children, Philadelphia
- St. Luke's Hospital, Bethlehem
- Temple University Health System, including: Temple University Hospital (TUH), TUH Episcopal Division, and Jeanes Hospital, Philadelphia

== Branch campuses ==
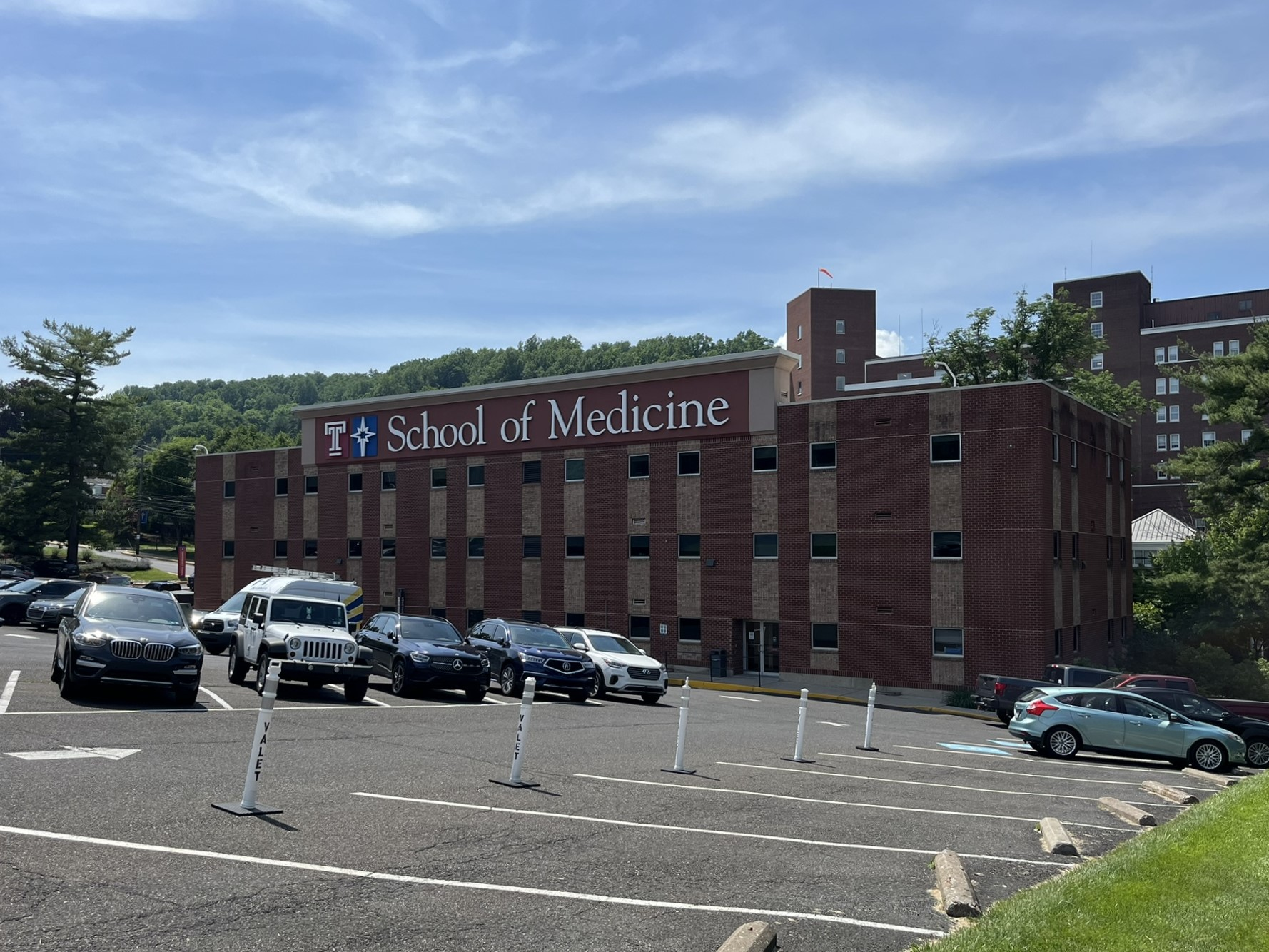
Lewis Katz School of Medicine, St. Luke's Campus

In response to the increasing demand for dedicated U.S. and Pennsylvania physicians, Temple University School of Medicine set out to establish branch campuses in various Pennsylvania locations. These regional campuses provide the same basic science courses offered at the main Philadelphia campus, but are based in separate cities. The first of these branch campuses was established at St. Luke's Hospital, Bethlehem, Pennsylvania and opened in Fall of 2011 with an inaugural class of 30. The Bethlehem campus now matriculates approximately 40 new students per year.

In August of 2024, LKSOM announced plans to establish a second branch campus in York County, Pennsylvania in partnership with Wellspan Health, with an inaugural class of approximately 40 students expected in 2027. This new campus would bring the total class size of LKSOM to approximately 260 students.

== Notable alumni and pioneers ==
The school has been home to many accomplished alumni and faculty, including:

- William Wayne Babcock, inventor of the Babcock surgical forceps
- Catherine L. Bacon, a leading expert in psychosomatic medicine
- Harry E. Bacon, the first editor of the SKULL yearbook and Head of Division of Colorectal Surgery
- John Joyce, dermatologist and U.S. Congressman currently representing Pennsylvania's 13th district
- W. Emory Burnett, an outstanding worker in thoracic and vascular surgery, performed the first human pneumonectomy in Philadelphia
- W. Edward Chamberlain, a radiologist who developed contrast and cine radiological techniques with Temple associates. Their image intensifier in fluoroscopy made possible movie films, television viewing and three-dimensional effects in x-ray diagnosis.
- Agnes Barr Chase, an accomplished artist and illustrator, she collaborated with her husband, Dr. Theodore L. Chase, in compiling an atlas of surgery.
- Angelo DiGeorge M.D., a pediatrician who first described DiGeorge Syndrome as a practitioner at LKSOM
- Thomas Durant MD, a notable contributor in specialties of electrocardiography, contrast visualization, and the dynamics of circulation and respiration. Dr. Durant also served as the Chair of the American Board of Internal Medicine and President of the American Federation for Clinical Research during his career.
- O. Spurgeon English, a renowned psychiatrist who, with Dr. Edward Weiss at Temple, wrote a signal volume on psychosomatic medicine. A distinguished teacher and psychotherapist, he established clinics in child, adult and family mental health.
- Temple S. Fay, a neurosurgeon who introduced the use of hypothermia in medical and surgical illnesses. He also developed rehabilitation procedures based upon analysis of phylogenetic movements.
- Edward Goljan M.D., a well known physician among medical students for his development of medical licensing exam study materials.
- Harriet L. Hartley, Professor of Hygiene and Public Health for 20 years (1924–44). She made major contributions to maternal and child health and environmental sanitation.
- Marvin Haskin, physician, professor, medical author, editor, and researcher
- John Franklin Huber an eminent anatomist, distinguished for his delineation of the bronchopulmonary segments
- Chevalier Jackson M.D., pioneer in the field of otolaryngology
- Richard A. Kern, a pioneer allergist, medical leader, and statesman. As an expert in military and tropical medicine, he served as Chair of the Department of Medicine, and was a Trustee of Temple University and President of the American College of Physicians.
- John A. Kolmer, a national leader in preventive medicine and public health, achieved wide recognition by his research in immunology, serodiagnosis and chemotherapy.
- Irena Koprowska, professor of pathology and a leader in cytopathology
- Frank H. Krusen, originator of the field of physical medicine, establishing the first such department in the US at Temple University Hospital (1929). He moved to the Mayo Clinic in 1935 and later returned to Temple, whose rehabilitation center bears his name.
- John Lachman, late Chairman of the Department of Orthopaedic Surgery and Sports Medicine at Temple who developed the reliable clinical test used to diagnose injury of the anterior cruciate ligament (ACL), which bears his name.
- Dawn B. Marks PhD, developer of innovative teaching techniques in biochemistry and molecular biology; grounding concepts in practical applications in clinical medicine. Her text, Review of Biochemistry (1990), has been translated into five languages and became the basis for a USMLE biochemistry board review book universally referenced by medical students preparing for the boards. She also wrote Basic Medical Biochemistry: A Clinical Approach (1996), and developed computer-based teaching programs. She was honored with numerous teaching awards throughout her career.
- James K. Min, Professor of Radiology and Medicine (Cardiology) at Weill Cornell Medical College and the Director of the Dalio Institute of Cardiovascular Imaging (ICI) at NewYork-Presbyterian Hospital.
- John Royal Moore, orthopedic surgeon, originated a technique of delayed reduction of fractures and gained wide recognition as both a practitioner and a teacher.
- Harris M. Nagler, MD, FACS., Physician-in-Chief and Chief Medical Officer for Mount Sinai Beth Israel Health System in Manhattan, and Senior Associate Dean for Clinical Affairs of the Mount Sinai Health System and Icahn School of Medicine at Mount Sinai
- Waldo Nelson M.D., editor of the Nelson's Textbook of Pediatrics
- Hugo Roesler, a Vienna-trained cardiologist/electrocardiographer and author of one of the earliest books on cardiovascular imaging (1937).
- David Ruhe, former member of the Universal House of Justice, the supreme governing body of the Baháʼí Faith.
- Machteld Elisabeth Sano, a Belgian-trained clinical pathologist known for her research on tissue culture and use of fibrin glue for skin grafting.
- Sol Sherry MD, revolutionized the treatment of acute MI through his pioneering work in thrombolytic therapy and trained many of today's leaders in the field of thrombosis and hemostasis. Dr. Sherry founded the Council on Thrombosis of the American Heart Association, International Council of Osmosis, and the International Society of Thrombosis and Haemostasis.
- Ernest A. Spiegel a neurologist who, together with Dr. Henry T. Wycis and others, devised stereoencephalotomy with stereotactic procedures for control of pain, tremor, and convulsive disorders.
- Shirley Tilghman Ph.D., an alumnus of the School's biochemistry department and first female president of Princeton University
- Sidney Weinhouse headed the Fels Research Institute of Temple University and Cancer Research. Noted for investigations of biochemical mechanisms and properties of cancer cells, he was elected to the National Academy of Sciences.
- Joseph Wolpe M.D., psychiatrist and father of behavioral modification therapy
- Bernard T. Mittemeyer M.D., former Surgeon General of the United States Army
- John E. Fryer M.D., famed psychiatrist and gay rights activist

== See also ==
- Medical schools in Pennsylvania
- Temple University
- Temple University Hospital
- St. Luke's University Health Network
- WellSpan Health
