= Angelo DiGeorge =

Angelo Mario DiGeorge
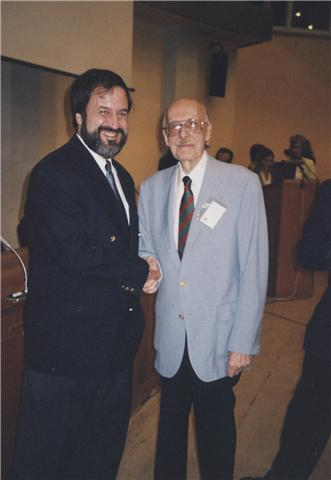
- DiGeorge (right) in 2002
- Born: April 15, 1921; Philadelphia, Pennsylvania, U.S.
- Died: October 11, 2009 (aged 88); Philadelphia, Pennsylvania, U.S.
- Education: Temple University
- Occupation: Pediatric Endocrinologist
- Years active: 1946–1989
- Employer: Temple University School of Medicine
- Known for: Discovery of DiGeorge syndrome
- Title: President, Lawson Wilkins Pediatric Endocrine Society
- Term: 1983–1984

Angelo Mario DiGeorge (April 15, 1921 – October 11, 2009) was an American physician and pediatric endocrinologist from Philadelphia who pioneered the research on the autosomal dominant immunodeficiency now commonly referred to as DiGeorge syndrome.

== Early life and education ==
DiGeorge was the son of two Italian immigrants, Antonio DiGiorgio and his wife Emilia (née Taraborelli). He was born in South Philadelphia on April 15, 1921. His teacher at primary school changed his Italian surname DiGiorgio into the "American" DiGeorge. He graduated at the top of his class from South Philadelphia High School for Boys in 1939 and was awarded the White Williams Scholarship at the Temple University, where he graduated with distinction in chemistry in 1943. DiGeorge received his medical degree with honors from Temple University School of Medicine in 1946, and completed his internship at Temple University Hospital. He then left Philadelphia from 1947 to 1949 to serve as captain and Chief of the Medical Service for the U.S. Army 124th Station Hospital in Linz, Austria. After returning to Philadelphia, Angelo met his future wife, Natalie Picarello, who was a registered nurse at Temple Hospital. He completed his pediatric residency at St. Christopher's Hospital for Children and did a postdoctoral fellowship in endocrinology at the Jefferson Medical College in 1954.

== Academic career ==
DiGeorge joined the Department of Pediatrics of Temple University School of Medicine in 1952. In 1967, he became a professor of pediatrics and an Emeritus Professor in 1991. Concurrently, he was also an attending physician at St. Christopher's, where he became the Chief of Endocrinology and Metabolism (1961–1989), and the Director of the Pediatric Clinical Research Center (1965–1982). He served on the Pediatric Endocrinology Subboard of the American Board of Pediatrics from 1987 until 1992. He was a founding member and past president (1983–1984) of the Lawson-Wilkins Pediatric Endocrine Society and was the author of the endocrinology chapter for the Nelson Textbook of Pediatrics, known by pediatricians around the world as the "Green Bible" for more than 40 years.

DiGeorge first gained international recognition in the mid-1960s for his ground breaking discovery of a disorder characterized by congenital absence of the thymus and associated abnormalities. This birth defect is now referred to as DiGeorge syndrome; alternate names include Velocardiofacial syndrome, Shprintzen Syndrome, and chromosome 22q11.2 deletion syndrome (the majority of affected individuals lack a distinct part of the long arm of chromosome 22). DiGeorge syndrome includes a pattern of more than 200 different defects, including hypoplastic thymus and parathyroid glands, conotruncal heart defects, and a characteristic facial appearance. Velocardiofacial syndrome is marked by the association of congenital conotruncal heart defects, cleft palate or velar insufficiency, facial anomalies, and learning difficulties. It is now accepted that these two syndromes represent the different expression of a unique disorder manifesting at different stages of life. DiGeorge Syndrome is one of the most common genetic disorders known, occurring in about one every 4,000 livebirths. DiGeorge's original 1965 report and the initial paper reporting on this anomaly have been widely quoted and continues to garner citations.

DiGeorge was described as a physician who emphasized a holistic approach to patient care. Outside of medicine, he had a range of interests, including gardening, the performing arts, politics, stamp collecting, and Philadelphia sports, particularly the Philadelphia Phillies. DiGeorge also participated in international scientific meetings, including events in Italy such as the San Giovanni Rotondo Medical Genetic School and a 2002 conference in Rome focused on 22q11 deletion syndrome. At the latter, he met Robert Shprintzen, with whom he had independently worked on related aspects of the same condition.

== Death ==
DiGeorge died at the age of 88 years, on October 11, 2009, of kidney failure at his home in East Falls, Philadelphia.
