= Waldo Nelson =

American pediatrician (1898–1997)

Waldo E. Nelson
- Born: August 17, 1898; McClure, Ohio, U.S.
- Died: March 2, 1997 (aged 98)
- Burial place: West Laurel Hill Cemetery, Bala Cynwyd, Pennsylvania, U.S.
- Education: Wittenberg College; University of Cincinnati College of Medicine
- Medical career
- Profession: Pediatrician
- Institutions: Temple University School of Medicine

Waldo Emerson "Bill" Nelson (August 17, 1898 – March 2, 1997) was an American pediatrician who was sometimes referred to as "the father of pediatrics". Nelson authored the leading pediatric textbook (now known as the "Nelson Textbook of Pediatrics") and was a longtime editor of The Journal of Pediatrics. He led the pediatrics department at Temple University School of Medicine.

== Early life and education ==
Waldo Nelson was born in McClure, Ohio, in 1898. His father was a pharmacist. He graduated from Wittenberg College. Though his original plan had been to attend business school, the death of Nelson's baby sister inspired him to enter medicine.

After working at Willys-Overland, Nelson received assistance from an executive at the automobile company and was able to go to medical school. He graduated from University of Cincinnati Medical School in 1926.

== Career ==
After completing an internship and residency in the same city, Nelson joined the staff of Cincinnati Children's Hospital in 1929. He left to work for the medical school at Temple in 1940, where he chaired the pediatrics department until 1964. He also worked as medical director for St. Christopher's Hospital for Children in Philadelphia from 1947 to 1964.

Nelson was well known for the textbook that he authored for half a century, the Nelson Textbook of Pediatrics. Between 1959 and 1978, he also served as editor for The Journal of Pediatrics. The journal's circulation tripled during his tenure. Nelson practiced medicine into his eighties and continued to attend and speak at meetings in his nineties.

He died of a stroke on March 2, 1997, and was interred at West Laurel Hill Cemetery in Bala Cynwyd, Pennsylvania.

He received the John Howland Award, the highest honor given by the American Pediatric Society (APS).
