= Posterolateral corner injuries =

- Specialty: Orthopedics

Posterolateral corner injuries (PLC injuries) of the knee are injuries to a complex area formed by the interaction of multiple structures. Injuries to the posterolateral corner can be debilitating to the person and require recognition and treatment to avoid long term consequences. Injuries to the PLC often occur in combination with other ligamentous injuries to the knee; most commonly the anterior cruciate ligament (ACL) and posterior cruciate ligament (PCL). As with any injury, an understanding of the anatomy and functional interactions of the posterolateral corner is important to diagnosing and treating the injury.

== Signs and symptoms ==
Patients often complain of pain and instability at the joint. With concurrent nerve injuries, patients may experience numbness, tingling and weakness of the ankle dorsiflexors and great toe extensors, or a footdrop.

=== Complications ===
Follow-up studies by Levy et al. and Stannard at al. both examined failure rates for posterolateral corner repairs and reconstructions. Failure rates repairs were approximately 37 – 41% while reconstructions had a failure rate of 9%. Other less common surgical complications include deep vein thrombosis (DVTs), infection, blood loss, and nerve/artery damage. The best way to avoid these complications is to preemptively treat them. DVTs are typically treated prophylactically with either aspirin or sequential compression devices (SCDs). In high risk patients there may be a need for prophylactic administration of low molecular weight heparin (LMWH). In addition, having a patient get out of bed and ambulate soon after surgery is a time honored way to prevent DVTs. Infection is typically controlled by administering 1 gram of the antibiotic cefazolin (Ancef) prior to surgery. Excessive blood loss and nerve/artery damage are rare occurrences in surgery and can usually be avoided with proper technique and diligence; however, the patient should be warned of these potential complications, especially in patients with severe injuries and scarring.

== Causes ==
The most common mechanisms of injury to the posterolateral corner are a hyperextension injury (contact or non-contact), direct trauma to the anteromedial knee, and noncontact varus force to the knee.

== Mechanism ==
Structures found in the posterolateral corner include the tibia, fibula, lateral femur, iliotibial band (IT band), the long and short heads of the biceps femoris tendon, the fibular (lateral) collateral ligament (FCL), the popliteus tendon, the popliteofibular ligament, the lateral gastrocnemius tendon, and the fabellofibular ligament. It has been reported that among these, the 3 most important static stabilizers of the posterolateral corner are the FCL, popliteus tendon, and popliteofibular ligament Studies have reported that these structures work together to stabilize the knee by restraining varus, external rotation and combined posterior translation with external rotation to it.

=== Bones ===
The bones that make up the knee are the femur, patella, tibia, and fibula. In the posterolateral corner, the bony landmarks of the tibia, fibula and femur serve as the attachment sites of the ligaments and tendons that stabilize this portion of the knee. The patella plays no significant role in the posterolateral corner. The bony shape of the posterolateral knee, with the two convex opposing surfaces of the lateral femoral condyle and the lateral tibial plateau, makes this portion of the knee inherently unstable compared to the medial aspect. Thus, it has a much higher risk of not healing properly after injury than the medial aspect of the knee.

=== Ligaments ===
The fibular collateral ligament (FCL) connects the femur to the fibula. It attaches on the femur just proximal and posterior to the femoral lateral epicondyle and extends approximately 70 mm down the knee to attach to the fibular head. From 0° to 30° of knee flexion, the FCL is the main structure preventing varus opening of the knee joint. The popliteofibular ligament (PFL) connects the popliteus muscle at the musculotendinous junction to the posterior and medial portion of the fibular styloid. It has two divisions, anterior and posterior, and acts to stabilize the knee during external rotation. The mid-third lateral capsular ligament is made of a part of the lateral capsule as it thickens and extends along the femur, attaching just anterior to the popliteus attachment at the lateral epicondyle, and extends distally to the tibia attaching slightly posterior to Gerdy's tubercle and anterior to the popliteal hiatus. In addition, it has a capsular attachment at the lateral meniscus. It has two divisions, the meniscofemoral component and the meniscotibial component named for the areas they span, respectively. Studies suggest that the mid-third capsular ligament functions as a secondary varus stabilizer in the knee.

=== Tendons and muscles ===
The long and short heads of the biceps femoris each branch off into 5 attachment arms as they course distally in the knee. In the posterolateral corner, the long head has 3 important anatomic attachments. The direct arm attachment is on the posterolateral fibular styloid, the anterior arm lateral to the FCL and the lateral aponeurotic arm on the posterior and lateral portion of the FCL. The short head of the biceps also has 3 important arms in the posterolateral corner. The capsular arm attaches to the posterolateral capsule as well as the fibula, just lateral to the styloid and provides a strong attachment to the capsule, lateral gastrocnemius tendon, and capsuloosseus layer of the IT band. The fabellofibular ligament is actually a thickening of the capsular arm of the biceps femoris as it runs distally to the fibula. The direct arm attaches to the posterior and lateral aspect of the fibular styloid. The anterior arm attaches to the tibia at the same site as the mid-third lateral capsular ligament and is often injured in Segond fractures. Injuries to the biceps femoris tendons have been reported in patients with anterolateral-anteromedial rotatory instability.

The popliteus tendon's main attachment is on the femur at the proximal portion of the popliteus sulcus. As the tendon runs posteriorly and distally behind the knee, it gives off 3 fascicles that attach to and stabilize the lateral meniscus. The popliteus tendon provides static and dynamic stabilization to the knee during posterolateral rotation. The iliotibial band (IT band) is mainly divided into two layers, the superficial and capsuloosseus layers. The superficial layer runs along the lateral knee and attaches to Gerdy's tubercle and sends a deeper portion that attaches to the lateral intermuscular septum (IM septum). The capsuloosseus layer extends from the IM septum and merges with the short head of the biceps femoris attaching with it at the anterolateral aspect of the tibia. The IT band stabilizes the posterolateral corner by helping to prevent varus opening. The lateral gastrocnemius tendon inserts on the supracondylar process of the femur slightly posterior to the FCL. Injuries involving this tendon are typically associated with severe traumas and are not often seen.

== Diagnosis ==
The majority of posterolateral knee injuries occur in combination with another ligamentous injury, such as a cruciate ligament tear. This can make the diagnosis difficult and calls for the use of plain film radiographs and MRI to aid in the diagnosis. During the physical exam, it is imperative to assess a patient for signs of nerve injury as up to 15% of PLC injuries have associated nerve damage. Numbness, tingling, and/or dorsiflexor/great toe extensor muscle weakness all may suggest possible nerve damage.

=== Radiographs ===
Normal antero-posterior (AP) radiographs are useful to look for Segond fractures and fibular head avulsion fractures. Bilateral varus stress AP radiographs comparing the injured leg to the normal side are useful in assessing the lateral joint space for opening after a potential injury. More than a 2.7 mm increase between sides indicates a fibular collateral ligament tear, while greater than 4.0 mm indicates with a grade III posterolateral knee injury. Posterior stress radiographs taken with the patient kneeling show the amount of posterior tibial translation in both knees and are helpful to diagnose PCL insufficiency and combined injuries. Between 0–2 mm increased posterior translation between the affected and healthy knees is normal, 2–7 mm indicates a partial tear, 8–11 mm suggests a complete tear and greater than 12 mm suggests a combined PCL and PLC injury.

=== MRI ===
High quality MRI images (1.5 T magnet or higher ) of the knee can be extremely useful to diagnose injuries to the posterolateral corner and other major structures of the knee. While the standard coronal, sagittal and axial films are useful, thin slice (2 mm ) coronal oblique images should also be obtained when looking for PLC injuries. Coronal oblique images should include the fibular head and styloid to allow for evaluation of the FCL and popliteus tendon.

=== Specialized tests ===
In addition to a complete physical examination of the lower extremity, there are a set of specialized tests that must be synthesized to specifically check for injuries to the posterolateral corner. It is always important when evaluating an extremity for injury to compare it with the normal side to make sure you are not seeing a normal variation within that patient:

- External Rotation Recurvatum Test - One of the first tests developed to assess the PLC, the external rotation recurvatum test is performed with the patient lying supine. The practitioner stabilizes the distal thigh with one hand while lifting the great toe with the other. The injured side is compared to the healthy one and a positive test is indicated by an increased amount of recurvatum, or hyperextension, in the affected knee. Increased recurvatum indicates possible combined injuries to the posterolateral corner and cruciate ligaments. The increase on recurvatum is best reported as the heel height off the examining table.
- Varus stress test at 0° and 30° - Varus stress testing is accomplished while the patient is lying supine on an examination table. The physician supports the thigh against the side of the exam table and applies a varus force to the knee joint while holding the ankle or foot, first at 0°of flexion and then at 30°. As the knee is stressed, the practitioner should feel for increased gapping at the lateral joint space. Gapping can be graded based on the amount the joint opens under stress; grade I causes pain, but with no gap present, grade II causes some gapping, but a definite endpoint is present, and grade III causes significant gapping with no definite endpoint felt. A negative varus stress test shows no difference between either knee at 0° or 30°. Increased gapping at 0° of flexion typically reflects a serious posterolateral injury with a high probability of accompanying cruciate ligament involvement. Lower grades at 30° are more suggestive of partial tears of the FCL or mid-third lateral capsular ligament, while higher grades indicate complete tears of the FCL and damage to other posterolateral structures.
- Dial Test (posterolateral rotation test) - The dial test can be performed with a patient lying supine or prone. With the patient supine and the knees flexed 30° off the table, stabilize the thigh and externally rotate the foot. As the foot rotates, watch for external rotation of the tibial tubercle of the affected knee compared to the healthy one. A difference of greater than 10-15° indicates a positive test and likely injuries to the posterolateral knee. Next, repeat the test with the patient's knees flexed at 90°. Increased rotation at 90° indicates a combined PCL and posterolateral knee injury. If the rotation decreases compared to 30°, then an isolated PLC injury has occurred. Beware of a possible medial knee injury in the face of a positive dial test.
- Posterolateral Drawer Test - The posterolateral drawer test is similar to the commonly known posterior drawer test for PCL stability. Have the patient lie on their back with the knee flexed at 90° and externally rotate the foot to approximately 15°. While stabilizing the foot, apply a posterolateral rotation force to the tibia and watch for the amount of posterolateral rotation. Increased mobility and posterolateral rotation compared to the contralateral normal side usually indicates an injury to the popliteus complex.
- Reverse Pivot Shift Test - The reverse pivot shift test is almost exactly as its name implies, a reverse of the pivot shift test. The patient lies on their back with their knee flexed to between 45° and 60° and their foot externally rotated. The practitioner applies a valgus force while slowly extending the knee. A clunk will be felt around 30° of knee flexion if the subluxed or dislocated joint has reduced. This occurs as the iliotibial band changes from a knee flexor to extensor around 30°. Again, the affected knee should be compared the normal side to rule out a false positive test.
- Lachman & Posterior drawer tests - Increased anterior translation on the Lachman test is found when the patient has had a combined ACL and PLC injury. Increased posterior translation on the posterior drawer test indicates a combined posterior cruciate ligament tear with the PCL injury.
- Figure 4 Test - The patient lies supine and flexes their affected knee to approximately 90° then crosses it over the normal side with the foot across the knee and the hip externally rotated. The practitioner applies a varus stress on the joint by pushing the affected knee towards the exam table. This places tension on the posterolateral structures of the knee, especially the popliteus complex and popliteomeniscal fascicles. If these structures have been disrupted by injury, there is no tension to stabilize the lateral meniscus and the lateral meniscus can displace medially into the joint causing the patient pain and reproducing their symptoms at the lateral joint line. As always, the injured knee should be compared to the contralateral normal side.

=== Gait analysis ===
Patients with knee injuries suspected to involve the posterolateral corner should have their gait observed to look for a varus thrust gait, which is indicative of these types of injuries. As the foot makes contact with the ground, the compartments of the knee should remain tight and stabilize the joint through the impact and movements of walking. In posterolateral corner injuries, the lateral compartment has lost all or part of its stability and cannot maintain normal anatomic positioning when stressed. A varus thrust gait occurs as the foot strikes and the lateral compartment opens due to the forces applied on the joint. This forces the joint to sublux into a varus position to compensate. In chronic injuries, patients sometimes learn to walk with a partially flexed knee to alleviate the instability caused by their injury. Patients with medial compartment arthritis can also demonstrate a varus thrust gait, so it is important to differentiate between the two causes using plain radiographs. Patients with PLC injuries will have increased lateral gapping on varus stress radiographs, while arthritis patients have no gapping but should show signs of joint space narrowing, subchondral cysts, osteophytes, and/or sclerotic bone changes.

=== Arthroscopy ===
Arthroscopy is another useful tool to diagnose and assess injuries to the posterolateral corner. Arthroscopy is useful in two ways. First, a patient undergoing arthroscopy is placed under anesthesia which allows for a complete physical examination using the specialized tests described above, which can be difficult with the patient awake. A prospective study that looked at 30 patients undergoing arthroscopy found all of them to have a positive "drive through sign" during evaluation. A drive through sign occurs when there is more than 1 cm of lateral joint opening when a varus stress is applied to the knee which allows the surgeon to easily pass the arthroscope between the lateral femoral condyle and tibia . Second, arthroscopy allows the surgeon to visualize individual structures in the posterolateral knee. The specific structures that can be evaluated are the popliteus tendon attachment on the femur, the popliteomensical fascicles, the coronary ligament of the posterior horn of the lateral meniscus, and the meniscofemoral and meniscotibial portions of the mid-third lateral capsular ligament. Examination of these structures allows injuries to be identified and will direct the placement of incisions for repair or reconstruction.

== Prevention ==
As with any body part, maintaining strength and flexibility of the muscles can help to prevent injuries. Specifically in the knee, the quadriceps and hamstring muscles help to stabilize the knee, and maintaining their strength and flexibility will help prevent minor stresses from developing into major injuries. Proper footwear can also help prevent injuries. Wearing shoes that are appropriate for the activity help decrease the risk of slipping or twisting forces acting on the knee. In some circumstances, prophylactic bracing or taping may reduce the risk of injury as well.

== Treatment ==
Treatment of posterolateral corner injuries varies with the location and grade of severity of the injuries. Patients with grade I and II (partial) injuries to the posterolateral corner can usually be managed conservatively. Studies have reported that patients with grade III (complete) injuries do poorly with conservative management and typically will require surgical intervention followed by rehabilitation.

=== Nonoperative treatment ===
Conservative treatment relies on immobilizing the knee in full extension to allow the stretched or torn ligaments to heal. It is imperative that the patient keep the knee immobilized and not bear weight on the joint for 3 to 4 weeks to allow sufficient time for the structures to heal. Following immobilization, the patient can begin exercises to improve range of motion and begin bearing weight on crutches only. The crutches can be discontinued when the patient can walk without limping. Quadriceps strengthening exercises are allowed, but no isolated hamstring exercises should be attempted for 6 – 10 weeks following the injury. If after 10 weeks, pain or instability continue, the patient should be reevaluated for surgical treatment.

=== Operative treatment ===
This portion of the knee is felt to contain the most complex anatomy and to be the rarest type of knee injury. For this reason, consideration should be given to referral to a complex knee specialist for treatment. Surgical treatment of posterolateral corner injuries depend on whether the injury is of an acute or chronic nature and whether it is isolated to the posterolateral corner or combined with another ligamentous injury. Operative treatment is aimed at an anatomical repair or reconstruction rather than a non-anatomic reconstruction of the torn structures when possible, because this provides the highest odds of a successful return to function. The optimal time for treatment of acute injuries is within the first 3 weeks to avoid complications caused by scar tissue and the body's repair mechanisms. Chronic PLC injuries are less likely to be amenable to repair due to complications from scar tissue and limb malalignment; these injuries will likely necessitate reconstruction. Knees in varus alignment and which have chronic injuries (evaluated by long leg standing radiographs) will require a staged procedure that starts with an opening wedge osteotomy. This procedure lessens the constraint on the knee and prevents the reconstruction grafts from stretching out. If the patient still has instability, the PLC reconstruction will take place approximately 6 months later. MRI scans will be helpful in determining whether torn structures are amenable to repair or will require reconstruction with allografts.

The structures considered for potential reconstruction are the fibular collateral ligament, popliteus tendon, and popliteofibular ligament. The FCL and/or popliteus tendon are only considered for acute repair when they are avulsed off bone and can be reattached anatomically with the knee in extension. The PFL can be repaired when it is torn directly off of the fibular head and the popliteus is still intact. Reconstruction is preferred when the ligaments/tendons have mid-substance tears or other tears not amenable to repair. Reconstruction of either the FCL or popliteus tendon is typically completed utilizing a patient's hamstring (semitendinous) for a graft; however when reconstructing both the FCL and popliteus an Achilles tendon graft from a cadaver is preferred.

==== Acute isolated posterolateral corner injuries ====
Isolated injuries to the posterolateral corner are best repaired in an anatomic fashion by attempting to reestablish the previous location of the damaged structure. Typically damaged structures can be directly sutured or anchored back to their bony attachments. The goal is to always achieve a stable and secure repair so that patients can initiate ROM exercises. Certain situations require more complicated repairs: Femoral avulsions of the FCL or popliteus typically require a slightly more complex repair using a recess procedure in which stitches are placed through a bone tunnel and around the avulsed structure to provide further stabilization and return to range of motion exercises. Avulsion fractures that occur at the fibular head or fibular styloid typically are caused by detachment of the popliteofibular ligament, direct arm of either the long or short heads of the biceps femoris or FCL. These fractures are best repaired with nonabsorbable suture or with wires. If the fracture is large enough, open fixation with surgical hardware may be required.

Midsubstance tears of the FCL or popliteus tendon are best treated with anatomic reconstructions.

An all arthroscopic popliteus sling reconstruction through the "popliteus portal" can be performed for posterolateral rotatory instability.

==== Acute combined posterolateral corner injuries ====
Treatment for patients with combined grade III posterolateral injuries is quite similar to that of isolated PLC injuries. Repair or anatomic reconstruction of the posterolateral structures should be scheduled within 3 weeks of the initial injury. The other structures damaged should be reconstructed concurrently with the posterolateral structures so that the patient can readily return to a rehab program stressing range of motion exercises. This acts to prevent the development of arthrofibrosis (excessive scar tissue build up).

==== Chronic isolated posterolateral corner injuries ====
Patients with chronic isolated posterolateral corner injuries that are in varus alignment will require a staged procedure that starts with an opening wedge osteotomy. Multiple studies agree that reconstruction of chronic grade III PLC injuries have significantly better outcomes than repairs; however, If MRI reveals repairable damage of some individual structures in the PLC, repairs can done in a similar fashion the method described above for acute posterolateral injuries. These structures which can be repaired include the biceps femoris and mid-third lateral capsular ligament. The vast majority of these patients will require reconstruction of the torn structures using an autograft or allograft to restore stability and function of the damaged structures. Anatomic (grafts placed in the exact attachment sites) allograft reconstruction of the FCL and/or popliteus tendon and popliteofibular ligament complex restore the static stabilizers of the posterolateral knee, which allows for early postoperative range of motion. An all arthroscopic "Popliteus Sling" reconstruction using the "Popliteus Portal" is a minimally invasive method to treat the posterolateral rotatory instability due to chronic PLC laxity

==== Chronic combined posterolateral corner injuries ====
Similar to chronic isolated injuries, patients with chronic combined posterolateral knee injuries showing varus alignment will first require an opening wedge osteotomy as part of a staged procedure. With chronic combined PLC injuries the surgeon should treat the injury as if it was isolated with an anatomic reconstruction concurrent with a standard reconstruction of the accompanying ACL and/or PCL injuries. The key point here is that the multiligament reconstructions be done at the same time and not as a staged procedure. This will allow for early range of motion (ROM) exercises to begin and prevent the formation of arthrofibrosis in the joint. All arthroscopic "popliteus Sling reconstruction" procedure with "Popliteus Portal' is a minimally invasive method of reconstruction in these conditions. In addition, failing to address a chronic posterolateral knee injury when repairing a deficient ACL or PCL has been shown to cause increased forces of the graft leading to cruciate reconstruction graft stretching and/or failure.

=== Rehabilitation ===
Rehabilitation protocols for post-op patients with repaired or reconstructed posterolateral corner injuries focus on strengthening and achieving full range of motion. Similar to nonoperative treatments, the patient is non-weightbearing for 6 weeks followed by a return to partial weight-bearing on crutches. Range of motion exercises begin first at 1 to 2 days postoperatively, followed by progressive strength training. Patients can typically begin riding a stationary bike and using a quadriceps machine around 6 to 8 weeks, but isolated hamstring exercises should be avoided for a minimum of 4 months postoperatively. Patients can progress to leg presses after 6 weeks, but the weight should be very light. Jogging and more aggressive strength training can begin around 4 – 6 months at the surgeon and physical therapists discretion. Patients should not be casted after surgery unless absolutely necessary.

== Surgical outcomes ==
A study by Geeslin and LaPrade indicated that patients reported positive outcomes in 94% of cases following a mix of repairs and reconstructions for with acute posterolateral knee injuries. Recent studies have reported failure rates between 37 and 40% for primary repairs of the main PLC structures Studies have shown that patients who undergo successful surgical repair of posterolateral knee injuries reported increased objective knee stability and better subjective outcomes than those who undergo reconstruction. A study by LaPrade et al. showed that patients with isolated or combined PLC injuries have positive outcomes when they undergo anatomic reconstruction of the damaged structures, and there was no difference between groups that require an osteotomy versus those who do not. Patients reported significant increases in both knee stability and function following reconstruction. Anatomic techniques aim to restore normal function of the knee's important static stabilizers and are recommended for patients with these types of injuries to provide the best outcomes.

== Epidemiology ==
Isolated and combined posterolateral knee injuries are difficult to accurately diagnose in patients presenting with acute knee injuries. The incidence of isolated posterolateral corner injuries has been reported to be between 13% and 28%. Most PLC injuries accompany an ACL or PCL tear, and can contribute to ACL or PCL reconstruction graft failure if not recognized and treated. A study by LaPrade et al. in 2007 showed the incidence of posterolateral knee injuries in patients presenting with acute knee injuries and hemarthrosis (blood in the knee joint) was 9.1%.

== Research ==
Future research into posterolateral injuries will focus on both the treatment and diagnosis of these types of injuries to improve PLC injury outcomes. Studies are needed to correlate injury patterns and mechanisms with clinical measures of knee instability and laxity.
