= James K. Min =

American physician

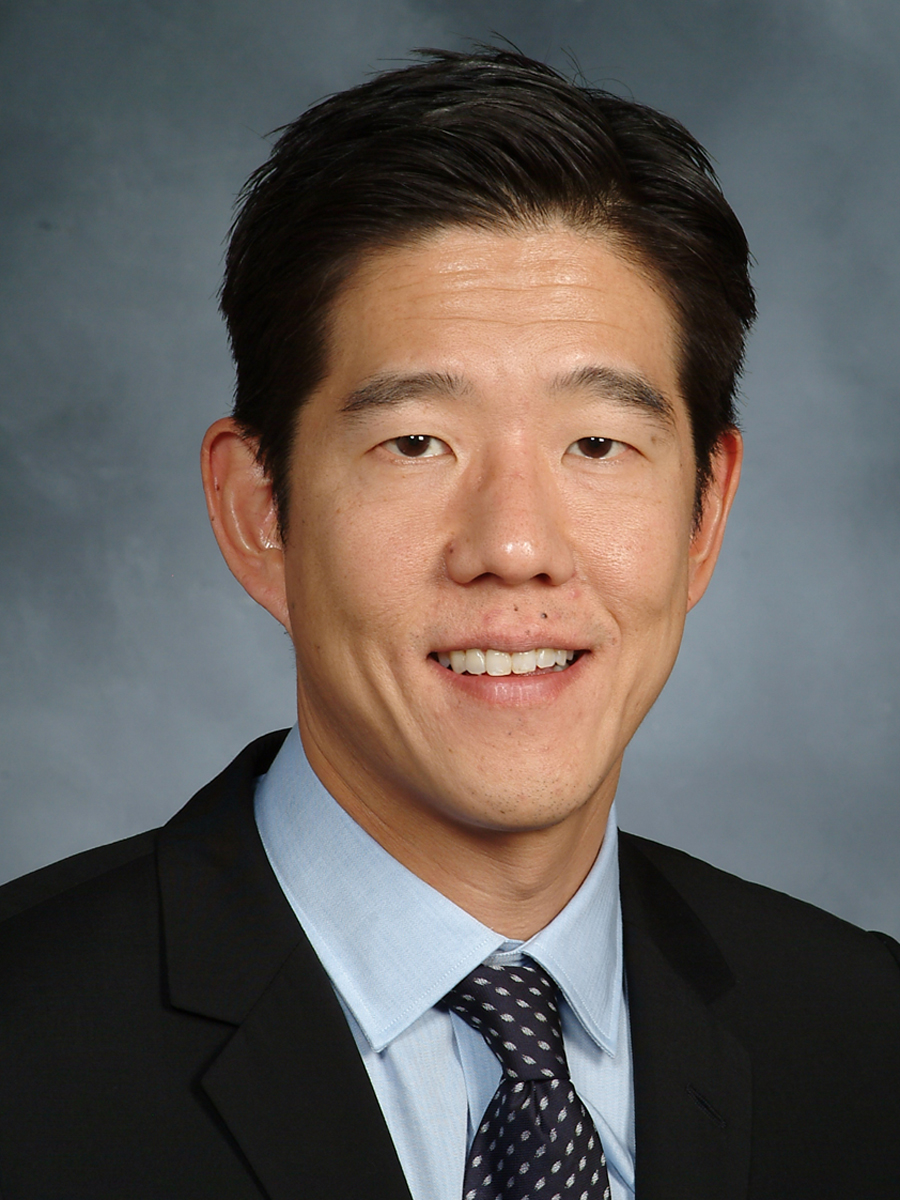
- Born: June 23, 1971 (age 55); Norman, Oklahoma, United States
- Education: Temple University School of Medicine (MD), University of Chicago (B.A.)
- Occupation: Director of the Dalio Institute of Cardiovascular Imaging at NewYork–Presbyterian Hospital/Weill-Cornell Medical Center

James K. Min (born June 23, 1971) is an American physician, a former professor of radiology at Weill Cornell Medical College, and a former director of the Dalio Institute of Cardiovascular Imaging at NewYork-Presbyterian Hospital/Weill-Cornell Medical Center. Prior to this, he held the title of professor of medicine at both Cedars Sinai Medical Center in Los Angeles, California, and David Geffen UCLA School of Medicine, Los Angeles, California. He is an expert in cardiovascular imaging and has led numerous multi-center international clinical trials. He studied clinical utility and coronary artery diseases for over ten years. During his work at UCLA and NewYork-Presbyterian Hospital/Weill-Cornell Medical Center, Min published over 250 papers on cardiac CT and coronary artery disease.

== Education and career ==
James Min received his Bachelor of Arts degree from University of Chicago in 1992 and his Doctor of Medicine from Temple University School of Medicine in 1999. He completed his residency in medicine and fellowship in radiology at the University of Chicago Hospitals.

Dr. Min was an assistant professor of medicine and an assistant professor of radiology at Weill Cornell Medical College, New York, NY, from 2005 to 2011. From 2011 to 2013, Dr. Min held the positions of associate professor of biomedical sciences, associate professor of imaging (radiology) and associate professor of medicine at Cedars-Sinai Medical Center, Los Angeles, California. From 2010 to 2013, he was a senior investigator at the Harvard Clinical Research Institute, Boston, Massachusetts.

He formerly worked at NewYork-Presbyterian Hospital/Weill-Cornell Medical Center as professor of radiology and the founder and director of the Dalio Institute for Cardiovascular Imaging. The Dalio Institute was founded by Min in order to help prevent and diagnose cardiovascular diseases by using state-of-the-art tools such as MRI, CT, and PET scans. The institute was funded, in part, by a $20 million donation from Ray Dalio, an American businessman and a lifelong trustee of NewYork-Presbyterian Hospital.

One of the most notable trials that Min has led is the CONFIRM Trial, a large prospective multi-center international database for cardiac CT and includes image data from more than 30,000 patients in over seven countries.

Dr. Min is currently the Founder and CEO of Cleerly, digital healthcare company creating a world without heart attacks.
