= The Journal of Pediatrics =

- Discipline: Pediatrics
- Language: English
- Edited by: Paul Graham Fisher

Publication details
- History: 1932–present
- Publisher: Elsevier
- Frequency: Monthly
- Impact factor: 4.406 (2020)

Standard abbreviations
- ISO 4: J. Pediatr.

Indexing
- CODEN: JOPDAB
- ISSN: 0022-3476
- LCCN: sg35000009
- OCLC no.: 01754720

Links
- Journal homepage; Online access; Online archive

The Journal of Pediatrics is a monthly peer-reviewed medical journal that covers all aspects of pediatrics. It was established in 1932 and is published by Elsevier. Although it was originally affiliated with the American Academy of Pediatrics, it is currently associated with the Association of Medical School Pediatric Department Chairs.

== Abstracting and indexing ==
The journal is abstracted and indexed in Scopus, PubMed, and MEDLINE. In 2020, according to the Journal Citation Reports, The Journal of Pediatrics had an impact factor of 4.406, ranking it 11th out of 129 journals in the category "Pediatrics".

== History ==
The Journal of Pediatrics was established in 1932 by the American Academy of Pediatrics and was published through a partnership with C. V. Mosby. This partnership ended in 1947 when the academy launched Pediatrics, citing their desire to have sole responsibility for all aspects of publishing their own society journal. The Journal of Pediatrics remained unaffiliated with any other medical society until 2001, when the Association of Medical School Pediatric Department Chairs began publishing a monthly feature in it. Since July 1947, the journal has been governed by its own editorial board, which has sole responsibility for creating and maintaining editorial policy. Due to the expanding international scope, an international advisory panel was added to the editorial board in 1999.

=== Editors-in-chief ===
The following persons have been or currently serve as editor-in-chief:

- Borden S. Veeder and Hugh McCulloch (1932–1947)
- Borden S. Veeder (1947–1959)
- Waldo E. Nelson (1959–1977)
- Joseph M. Garfunkel (1977–1995)
- William F. Balistreri (1996–2022)
- Paul Graham Fisher (2023 - present)
