= Marvin Haskin =

American radiologist (1930-2009)

- Born: May 28, 1930
- Died: March 1, 2009 (aged 78); Bryn Mawr, Pennsylvania, U.S.
- Resting place: West Laurel Hill Cemetery, Bala Cynwyd, Pennsylvania, U.S.
- Education: Temple University
- Medical career
- Profession: radiologist, professor
- Institutions: Philadelphia General Hospital; Hahnemann Medical College; Hahnemann University Hospital
- Notable works: Roentgenologic Diagnosis, Surgical Radiology

Marvin Edward Haskin (May 28, 1930 – March 1, 2009) was a physician, professor, and chair of the diagnostic radiology department at Hahnemann University for 22 years. He was an author, editor, and researcher in the field of radiology. He was a pioneer in the use of teleradiology.

== Early life and education ==
Haskin was born May 28, 1930, and raised in Ardmore, Pennsylvania; Paterson, New Jersey; and North Philadelphia. He graduated from Central High School in Philadelphia, and received a bachelors and medical degree from Temple University. He interned and completed his residency at Philadelphia General Hospital in diagnostic radiology.

== Career ==
He joined the United States Air Force and served as chief of radiology at Andrews Air Force Base in Washington D.C.

He worked as chief of diagnostic radiology at Philadelphia General Hospital from 1961 to 1969 and taught as an associate professor at Hahnemann Medical College. He was a professor and chair of the diagnostic radiology department at Hahnemann University Hospital for 22 years.

He designed the radiology department at Hahnemann including one of the first digital imaging rooms in the Philadelphia region. He oversaw the installment of one of the first CT scanners in Philadelphia in 1974. He pioneered the use of teleradiology, the transmission of patient radiological images for interpretation by a radiologist not at the same location.

He retired from Hahnemann and developed patents in teleradiology and devices to reduce hospital infections.

Haskin was a founding member of the Society for Computer Applications in Radiology; served on the editorial board of the Journal of Digital Imaging; and was a member of the Medical Devices Committee of the American National Standards Institute.

He was a member of several medical societies, including the American Association of University Radiologists, the Society of Magnetic Resonance Imaging, and the New York Academy of Sciences. He was a Fellow of the American College of Physicians, the American College of Radiology, the Philadelphia College of Physicians, and a member of the Royal College of Physicians and the Royal College of Medicine.

He died March 1, 2009, at Bryn Mawr Hospital and was interred at West Laurel Hill Cemetery in Bala Cynwyd, Pennsylvania.

== Personal life ==
He was married twice, first to Mary Singer Haskin, and then to Pamela Herr Haskin, whom he met when she worked as his editor at W.B. Saunders. He had one son.

== Publications ==
Haskin authored or edited fifteen books, including Roentgenologic Diagnosis and Surgical Radiology. He published nine book chapters, 84 professional journal papers, and presented over 100 times at scientific conferences.
