= Harriet L. Hartley =

American physician

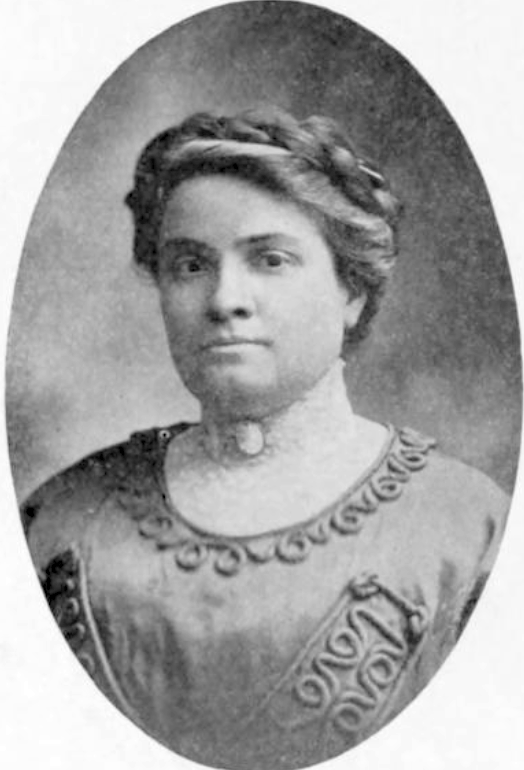
- Harriet L. Hartley, from a 1911 publication
- Born: Harriet Louise Hargrave; November 14, 1874; Philadelphia
- Died: October 18, 1951 (aged 76); Philadelphia
- Occupations: Physician, public health official, college professor

Harriet Louise Hargrave Hartley (November 14, 1874 – October 18, 1951), also written as Harriett L. Hartley, was an American physician, public health official, and college professor. The Harriet L. Hartley Conservation Area in Maine occupies land she once owned, and is named for her.

== Early life and education ==
Harriet Hargrave was born in Philadelphia in 1874, the daughter of WIlliam Henry Columbus Hargrave and Ella Louise Esler Hargrave. She completed her medical degree at the Woman's Medical College of Pennsylvania in 1903.

== Career ==
Hartley was clinical professor of surgery and associate professor in gynecology at the Woman's Medical College of Pennsylvania, and professor of preventive medicine at Temple University Medical School. She also taught first aid classes for women in the community. In 1915, she raised funds to send American women doctors and nurses to open a hospital for women and children affected by World War I.

In 1917 Hartley became Chief of the Philadelphia Health Department’s Bureau of Child Hygiene. She addressed the American Child Hygiene Association's 1918 annual meeting in Chicago to describe the toll of the Spanish flu pandemic on Philadelphia's children. In 1944 she was one of the speakers in a radio symposium for National Negro Health Week. She remained as head of the Bureau of Child Hygiene through the 1930s and 1940s.

Hartley was president of the Pennsylvania Public Health Association, Also known as the PPHA, from 1947 to 1948. She was a member of the Babies' Welfare Association, the Philadelphia Obstetrical Society, the Philadelphia County Medical Society, and the American Medical Association.

== Publications ==
- "A Plea for More Prenatal Work" (1917)
- "Infant Mortality Among the Colored Population" (1918)
- "The City Nurse as an Agent for the Prevention of Infant Mortality" (1919)
- "The Baby in the Epidemic" (1919)
- "A Milk Survey" (1920)
- "Prenatal Care from the Viewpoint of the City Health Center" (1920)

== Personal life and legacy ==
Harriet Hargrave married twice. She married physician F. Walter Brierly in 1897. He died from appendicitis in 1899. She married her second husband, anesthesiologist Arthur Hartley, in 1902. The Hartleys spent their summers in Belfast, Maine beginning in the 1920s. She was a widow when she died in Philadelphia in 1951, at the age of 77. The Harriet L. Hartley Conservation Area on Maine's Penobscot Bay is named in her memory.
