= WellSpan Health =

American integrated health system

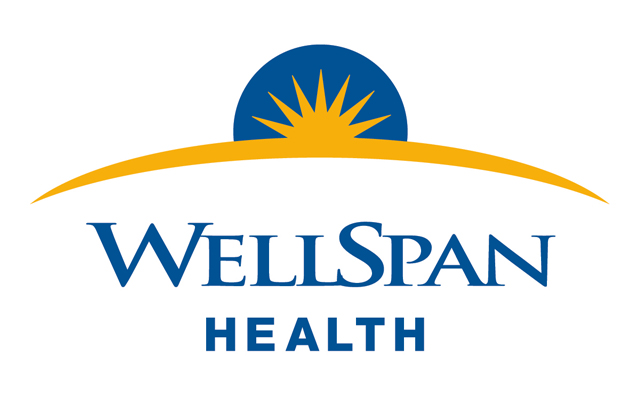
- Company type: Private (not-for-profit)
- Industry: Health care
- Founded: 1880
- Headquarters: United States
- Area served: Union, York, Adams, Lancaster, Franklin and Lebanon counties, Pennsylvania; Northern Maryland, U.S.
- Key people: Roxanna L. Gapstur, Ph.D, R.N., president and chief executive officer
- Number of employees: Approximately 23,000
- Website: http://www.wellspan.org/

WellSpan Health is an American integrated health system located in South-Central Pennsylvania and parts of northern Maryland. Headquartered in York, Pennsylvania and employing about 23,000 people, WellSpan Health operates nine hospitals (including a surgical hospital and a behavioral health hospital): WellSpan York Hospital, WellSpan Gettysburg Hospital, WellSpan Ephrata Community Hospital, WellSpan Good Samaritan Hospital, WellSpan Chambersburg Hospital, WellSpan Waynesboro Hospital, Wellspan Evangelical Community Hospital, WellSpan Philhaven, and WellSpan Surgery and Rehabilitation Hospital. WellSpan operates over 220 patient care locations which offer services such as diagnostic imaging, laboratory services, rehabilitation facilities, primary care facilities, urgent care facilities, specialty centers (such as cardiac centers, oncology centers, and neuroscience services), medical equipment retail, and retail pharmacies.

== History ==
In December 1879, York businessman Samuel Small gathered others in the community to discuss the idea of establishing a local hospital to support York's growing population needs and manufacturing interests. He offered to donate the land on which the hospital would be built, and on January 14, 1880, the letters of incorporation were filed with the Court of Common Pleas of York County to build the York Hospital and Dispensary. The three-story building was constructed at the corner of West College Avenue and Church Alley. An annual report for the year 1896 shows that a total of 1,922 cases were treated (1,756 in the dispensary and 166 as inpatients).

York Hospital and Dispensary later shortened its name to York Hospital and then York Health Network. In 1999, Gettysburg Hospital became the second hospital in York Health Network.

In 2000, York Health Network joined WellSpan Health.

Recent mergers and acquisitions include:

- Ephrata Community Hospital, Ephrata, Pennsylvania, on October 1, 2013
- Good Samaritan Health System, Lebanon, PA, on July 1, 2015
- Philhaven, the 14th largest mental health provider in the United States, on January 1, 2016
- Summit Health, a health system based in Franklin County, on November 1, 2018
- Evangelical Community Hospital, a health system based in Union County, on February 26, 2024

== Services and programs ==
=== Residency programs ===
WellSpan York Hospital, the health system's flagship hospital, offers many graduate medical educational programs, including 14 residency and fellowship programs sponsored in fields such as internal medicine, cardiovascular medicine, general surgery, emergency medicine, obstetrics and gynecology, dentistry, orthopedic surgery, sports medicine, osteopathic medicine, and family medicine. WellSpan York Hospital also hosts allied health certification programs for nurse anesthetists, radiology, phlebotomy, medical laboratory science, and respiratory care. Residency programs are also offered at several other of WellSpan's hospitals; these hospitals are often affiliated with different regional medical schools and universities.

=== Mental health services ===
Under the Philhaven name, WellSpan provides mental health services at 20 locations throughout its coverage area, including a 103-bed inpatient facility in Mount Gretna, Pennsylvania, additional psychiatric inpatient units at acute care hospitals, and out-patient and community based mental health programs.

=== Home health care ===
Through WellSpan VNA Home Care, WellSpan provides home health care services throughout the south central and central Pennsylvania region, including Franklin County, Cumberland County, Adams County, York County, Lancaster County, Lebanon County, Berks County, and Dauphin County.

=== Emergency services ===
WellSpan provides EMS coverage to a number of municipalities in several counties including York County and Franklin County. WellSpan also operates Disaster Response Teams (DRTs) at several of their hospitals which are tasked with responding during large scale disasters. These DRTs are capable of medical decontamination (decontaminating incoming patients from hazardous materials), assisting in hospital evacuations, among other things.

== Key statistics ==
- WellSpan Health provides more than $126 million each year in charitable, uncompensated care.
- Employs more than 23,000 employees across south central Pennsylvania.
- WellSpan Medical Group includes more than 1,200 primary care and specialty physicians and advanced practice clinicians.
- Includes more than 250 patient care locations that offer services such as diagnostic imaging, laboratory, rehabilitation, primary care, walk-in health care, durable medical equipment and other specialty services.
- Includes a regional home care organization (WellSpan VNA Home Care).
