= Open kinetic chain exercises =

Open chain exercises (OKE) are exercises that are performed where the hand or foot is free to move. The opposite of OKE are closed kinetic chain exercises (CKE). Both are effective for strengthening and rehabilitation objectives. Closed-chain exercises tend to offer more "functional" athletic benefits because of their ability to recruit more muscle groups and require additional skeletal stabilization.

== Properties ==
Single-joint versions of these exercises are typically non-weight bearing, with the movement occurring at the hinge joints (elbow or knee). If there is any weight applied, it is often applied to the distal portion of the limb. Open chain exercises are postulated to be advantageous in rehabilitation settings because they can be easily manipulated to selectively target specific muscles, or specific heads of certain muscles, more effectively than their closed chain counterparts, at different phases of contraction.

== Open kinetic chain upper body exercises ==
- Biceps curl
- Lying triceps extensions
- Bench press

== Open kinetic chain lower body exercises ==
- Leg extension
- Leg curl
