= Drawer test =

- ICD-10-PCS: GroupMajor.minor

The drawer test is used in the initial clinical assessment of suspected rupture of the cruciate ligaments in the knee.

== Procedure ==
The patient should be supine with the hips flexed to 45 degrees, the knees flexed to 90 degrees and the feet flat on table. The examiner positions himself by sitting on the examination table in front of the involved knee and grasping the tibia just below the joint line of the knee. The thumbs are placed along the joint line on either side of the patellar tendon. The tibia is then drawn forward anteriorly. An increased amount of anterior tibial translation compared with the opposite limb or lack of a firm end-point may indicate either a sprain of the anteromedial bundle or complete tear of the ACL. If the tibia pulls forward or backward more than normal, the test is considered positive. Excessive displacement of the tibia anteriorly suggests that the anterior cruciate ligament is injured, whereas excessive posterior displacement of the tibia may indicate injury of the posterior cruciate ligament.

== See also ==
- Anterior cruciate ligament injury
- Posterior cruciate ligament injury
- Lachman test
