= Posterior cruciate ligament =

One of four major ligaments of the knee

- Diagram of the knee

Details
- From: Antero-lateral aspect of medial femoral condyle
- To: Posterolateral aspect of proximal tibia

Identifiers
- Latin: ligamentum cruciatum posterius genus
- MeSH: D016119
- TA98: A03.6.08.008
- TA2: 1891
- FMA: 44617

The posterior cruciate ligament (PCL) is a ligament in each knee of humans and various other animals. It works as a counterpart to the anterior cruciate ligament (ACL). It connects the posterior intercondylar area of the tibia to the medial condyle of the femur. This configuration allows the PCL to resist forces pushing the tibia posteriorly relative to the femur.

The PCL and ACL are intracapsular ligaments because they lie deep within the knee joint. They are both isolated from the fluid-filled synovial cavity, with the synovial membrane wrapped around them. The PCL gets its name by attaching to the posterior portion of the tibia.

The PCL, ACL, MCL, and LCL are the four main ligaments of the knee in primates.

== Structure ==
The PCL is located within the knee joint where it stabilizes the articulating bones, particularly the femur and the tibia, during movement. It originates from the lateral edge of the medial femoral condyle and the roof of the intercondyle notch then stretches, at a posterior and lateral angle, toward the posterior of the tibia just below its articular surface.

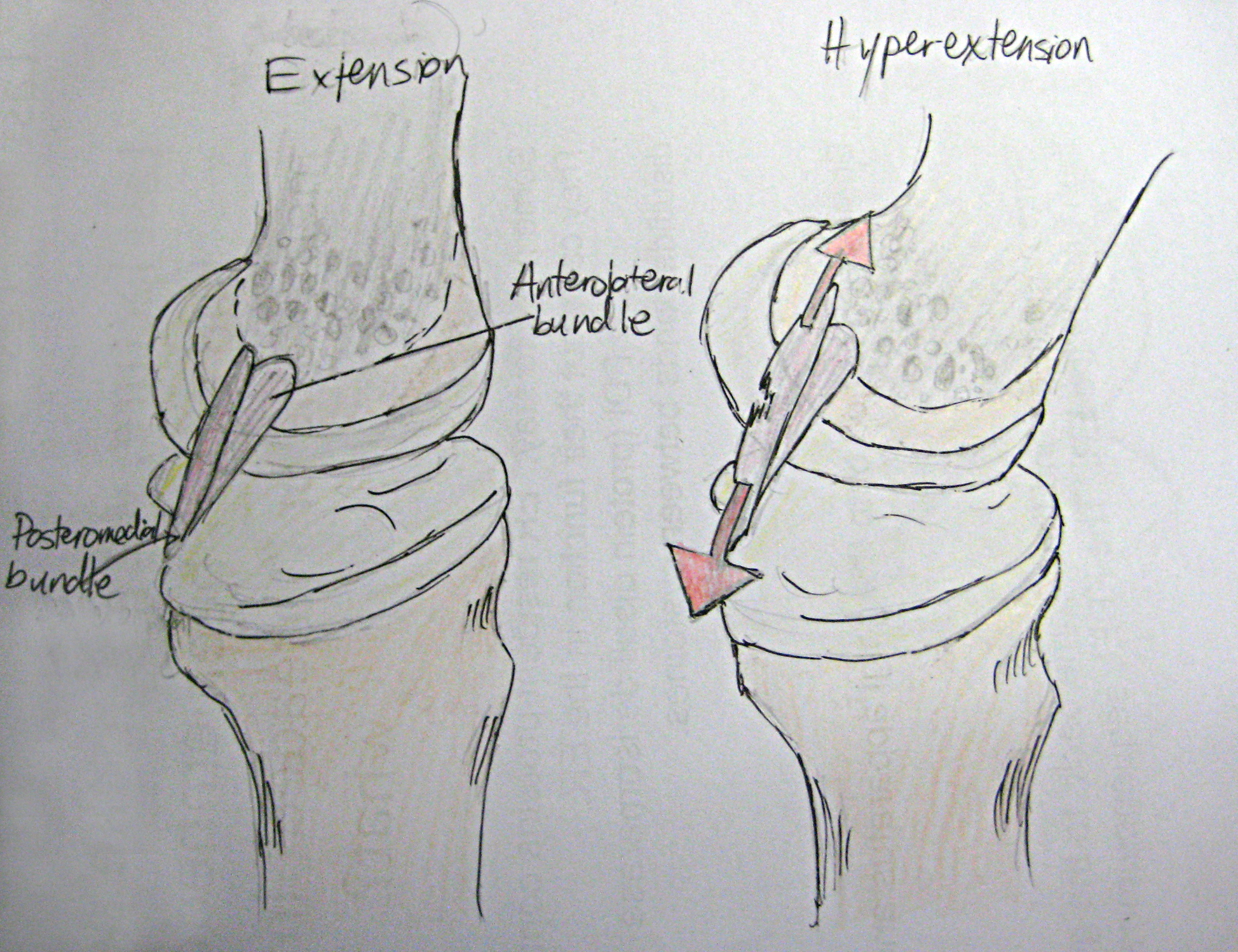
In this medial view of the extended knee, the lateral femoral condyle has been removed to reveal the structure of the PCL. Because the posteromedial bundle is stretched and the anterolateral bundle relaxed during extension, excessive extension in the form of hyperextension causes tensile stress, shown in red, on the posteromedial bundle of the PCL that leads to PCL injury.

== Function ==
Although each PCL is a unified unit, they are described as separate anterolateral and posteromedial sections based on where each section's attachment site and function. During knee joint movement, the PCL rotates such that the anterolateral section stretches in knee flexion but not in knee extension and the posteromedial bundle stretches in extension rather than flexion.

The function of the PCL is to prevent the femur from sliding off the anterior edge of the tibia and to prevent the tibia from displacing posterior to the femur. The posterior cruciate ligament is located within the knee. Ligaments are sturdy bands of tissues that connect bones. Similar to the anterior cruciate ligament, the PCL connects the femur to the tibia.

== Clinical significance ==
Common causes of injuries are direct blows to the flexed knee, such as the knee hitting the dashboard in a car accident or falling hard on the knee, both instances displacing the tibia posterior to the femur.

An additional test of posterior cruciate ligament injury is the posterior sag test, where, in contrast to the drawer test, no active force is applied. Rather, the person lies supine with the leg held by another person so that the hip is flexed to 90 degrees and the knee 90 degrees. The main parameter in this test is step-off, which is the shortest distance from the femur to a hypothetical line that tangents the surface of the tibia from the tibial tuberosity and upwards. Normally, the step-off is approximately 1 cm, but is decreased (Grade I) or even absent (Grade II) or inverse (Grade III) in injuries to the posterior cruciate ligament. The posterior drawer test is one of the tests used by doctors and physiotherapists to detect injury to the PCL. Patients who are suspected to have a posterior cruciate ligament injury should always be evaluated for other knee injuries that often occur in combination with an PCL injuries. These include cartilage/meniscus injuries, bone bruises, ACL tears, fractures, posterolateral injuries and collateral ligament injuries.

There are four different grades of classification in which medical doctors classify a PCL injury:

Grade I, the PCL has a slight tear.
Grade II, the PCL ligament is minimally torn and becomes loose.
Grade III, the PCL is torn completely and the knee can now be categorized as unstable.
Grade IV, the ligament is damaged along with another ligament housed in the knee (i.e. ACL).

With these grades of PCL injuries, there are different treatments available for such injuries.

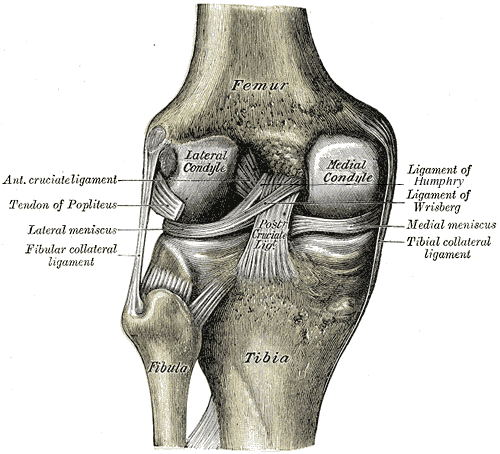
The posterior cruciate ligament is located within the knee

=== Mechanism ===
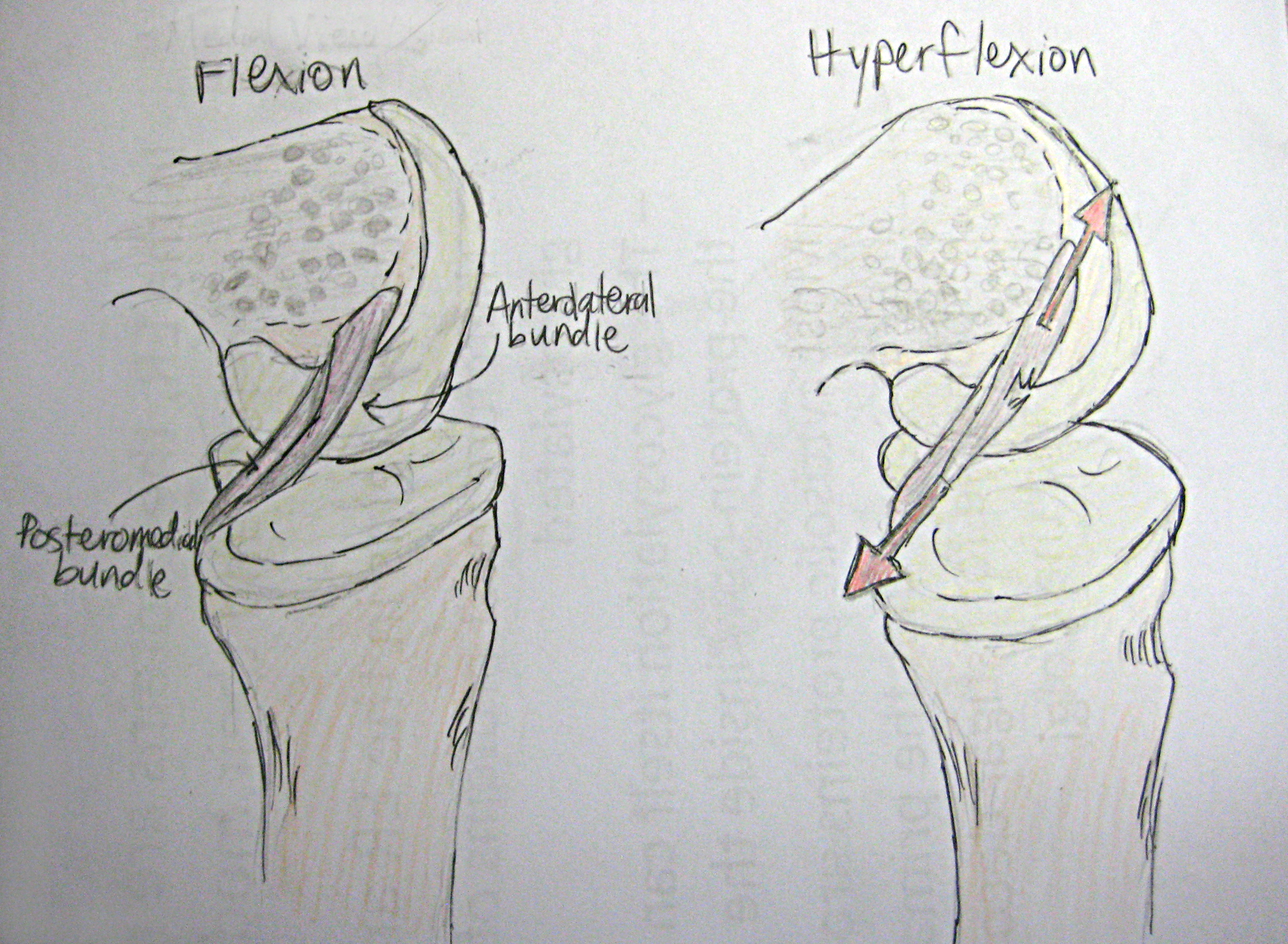
In this medial view of the flexed knee, the lateral femoral condyle has been removed to reveal the structure of the PCL. Because the anterolateral bundle is stretched and the posteromedial bundle relaxed during flexion, excessive flexion in the form of hyperflexion causes tensile stress, shown in red, on the anterolateral bundle of the ACL that leads to ACL injury.

In this position, the PCL functions to prevent movement of the tibia in the posterior direction and to prevent the tilting or shifting of the patella. However, the respective laxity of the two sections makes the PCL susceptible to injury during hyperflexion, hyperextension, and in a mechanism known as a dashboard injury. Because ligaments are viscoelastic) they can handle higher amounts of stress only when the load is increased slowly. When hyperflexion and hyperextension occur suddenly in combination with this viscoelastic behavior, the PCL deforms or tears. In the third and most common mechanism, the dashboard injury mechanism, the knee experiences impact in a posterior direction during knee flexion toward the space above the tibia. These mechanisms occur in excessive external tibial rotation and during falls that induce a combination of extension and adduction of the tibia, which is referred to as varus-extension stress, or that occur while the knee is flexed.

=== Treatment ===
It is possible for the PCL to heal on its own. Even if the PCL does not heal normally, it is unusual for surgery to be required. Treatment is usually physiotherapy to strengthen the muscles around the knee; usually they provide adequate stability even without a functional PCL. Only if there are ongoing symptoms down the track, or if there are other injuries in the knee (e.g. posterolateral corner injury) will ligament reconstruction be required. Ligament reconstruction is used to replace the torn PCL with a new ligament, which is usually a graft taken from the hamstring or Achilles tendon from a host cadaver. An arthroscope allows a complete evaluation of the entire knee joint, including the knee cap (patella), the cartilage surfaces, the meniscus, the ligaments (ACL & PCL), and the joint lining. Then, the new ligament is attached to the bone of the thigh and lower leg with screws to hold it in place. Surgery to repair the posterior cruciate ligament is controversial due to its placement and technical difficulty.

It is possible for the PCL to heal on its own without surgery when it is a Grade I or Grade II injury. PCL injuries that are diagnosed in these categories can have their recovery times reduced by performing certain rehabilitative exercises. Fernandez and Pugh(2012) found that following a PCL grade II diagnosis, a multimodal treatment that spanned the course of 8 weeks consisting of chiropractic lumbopelvic manipulation, physiotherapy, and implementing an exercise program that emphasized eccentric muscle contraction (lunges, 1-leg squats, and trunk stabilization proved to be an effective way to recover from the PCL injury. For Grades III and IV, operative surgery is recommended or is usually needed. Grafts is the method when addressing PCL injuries that are in need of operative surgery. With grafts, there are different methods such as the tibial inlay or tunnel method.

== Other animals ==
In the quadruped stifle (analogous to the human knee), based on its anatomical position, it is referred to as the caudal cruciate ligament.

== Additional images ==
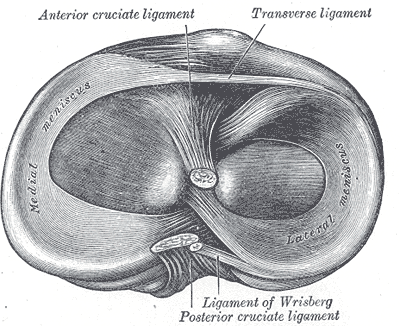
Head of right tibia seen from above, showing menisci and attachments of ligaments.

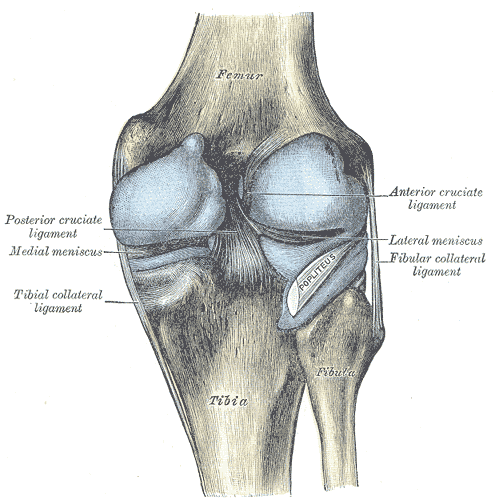
Capsule of right knee-joint (distended). Posterior aspect.

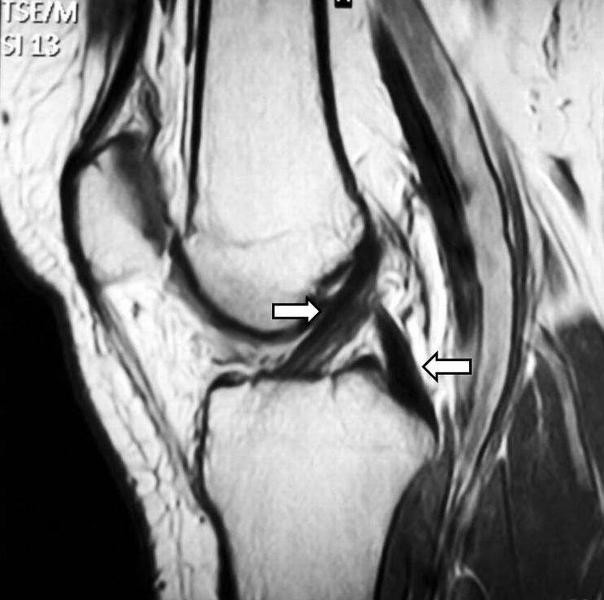
Magnetic resonance imaging evaluation demonstrating normal signal of both anterior and posterior cruciate ligaments (arrows).

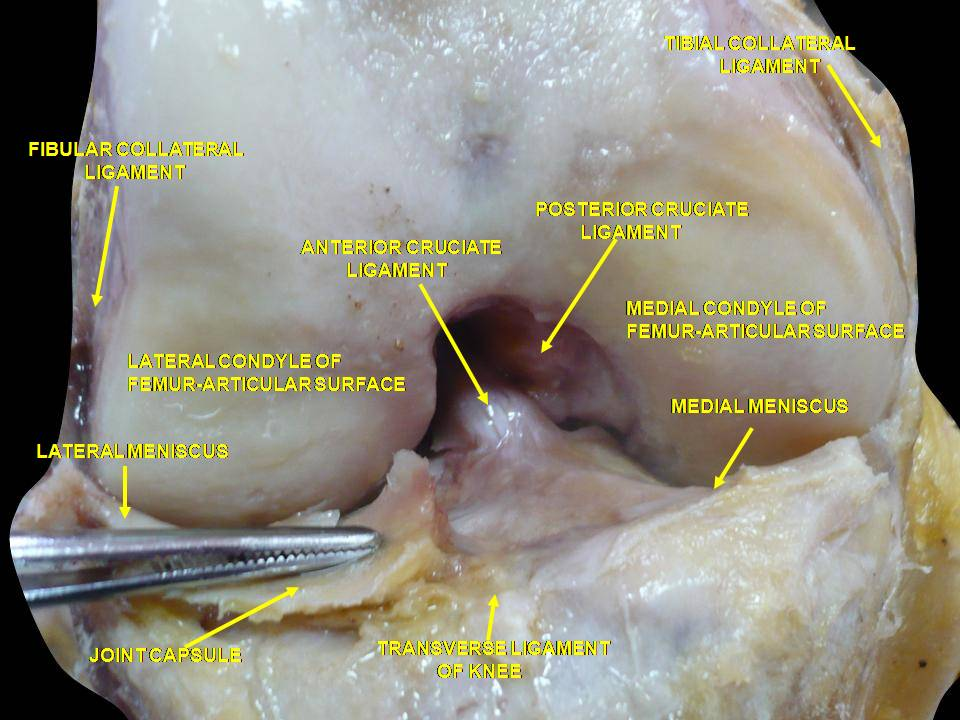
Anterior view of knee.

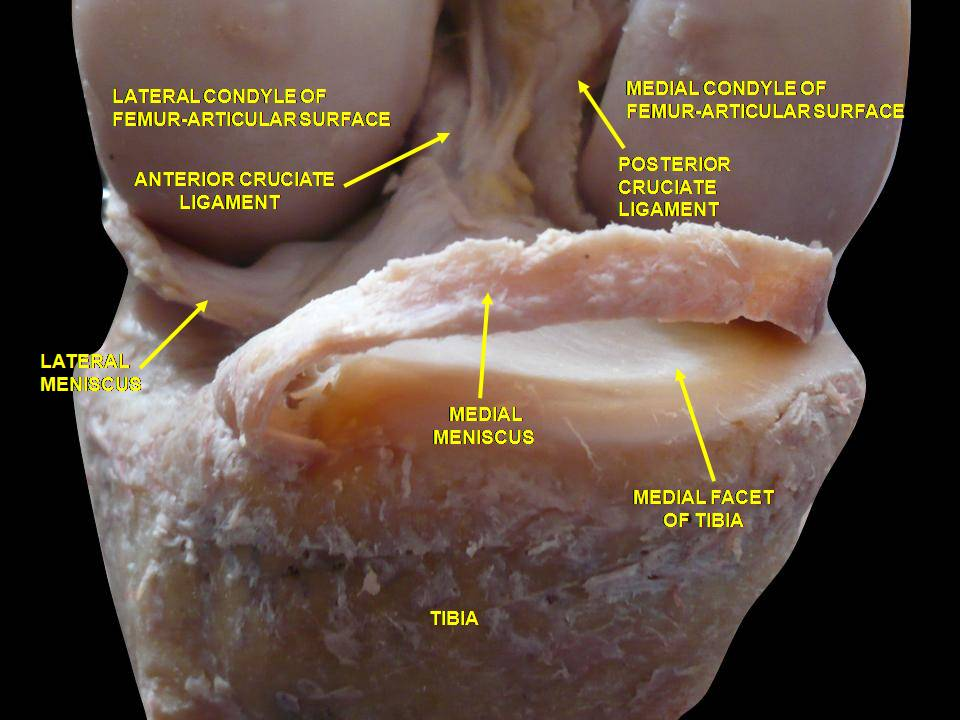
Knee joint. Deep dissection. Anterior view
