= Closed kinetic chain exercises =

Type of physical exercise

Closed kinetic chain exercises or closed chain exercises (CKC) are physical exercises performed where the hand (for arm movement) or foot (for leg movement) is fixed in space and does not move. The extremity remains in constant contact with the immobile surface, usually the ground or the base of a machine.

The opposite of CKC exercises are open kinetic chain exercises (OKC).

Closed chain exercises are often compound movements, that generally incur compressive forces, while open-chain exercises are often isolation movements that promote more shearing forces.

CKC exercises involve more than one muscle group and joint simultaneously rather than concentrating solely on one, as many OKC exercises do (single-joint movements), lending the former to more utilitarian and athletic activities.

== Properties ==
These exercises are typically weight bearing exercises, where an exerciser uses one's own body weight and/ or external weight.

== Closed kinetic chain upper body exercises ==
Push-ups and their derivatives (including handstand), pull-ups (or chin-ups), Supine row and dips, concentrate on a co-contraction of the triceps, biceps, deltoids, pectorals, lats, abdominals and lower back for stabilization in various ratios depending upon angle and leverage.

== Closed kinetic chain lower body exercises ==
Squats, deadlifts, lunges, power cleans: these concentrate on a co-contraction of the quadriceps, hamstrings, hip flexors, soleus, and gastrocnemius muscles. The joints of movement include the knee, hip, and ankle.

== See also ==
- Calisthenics
