= Lachman test =

Clinical test to diagnose injury to ligaments

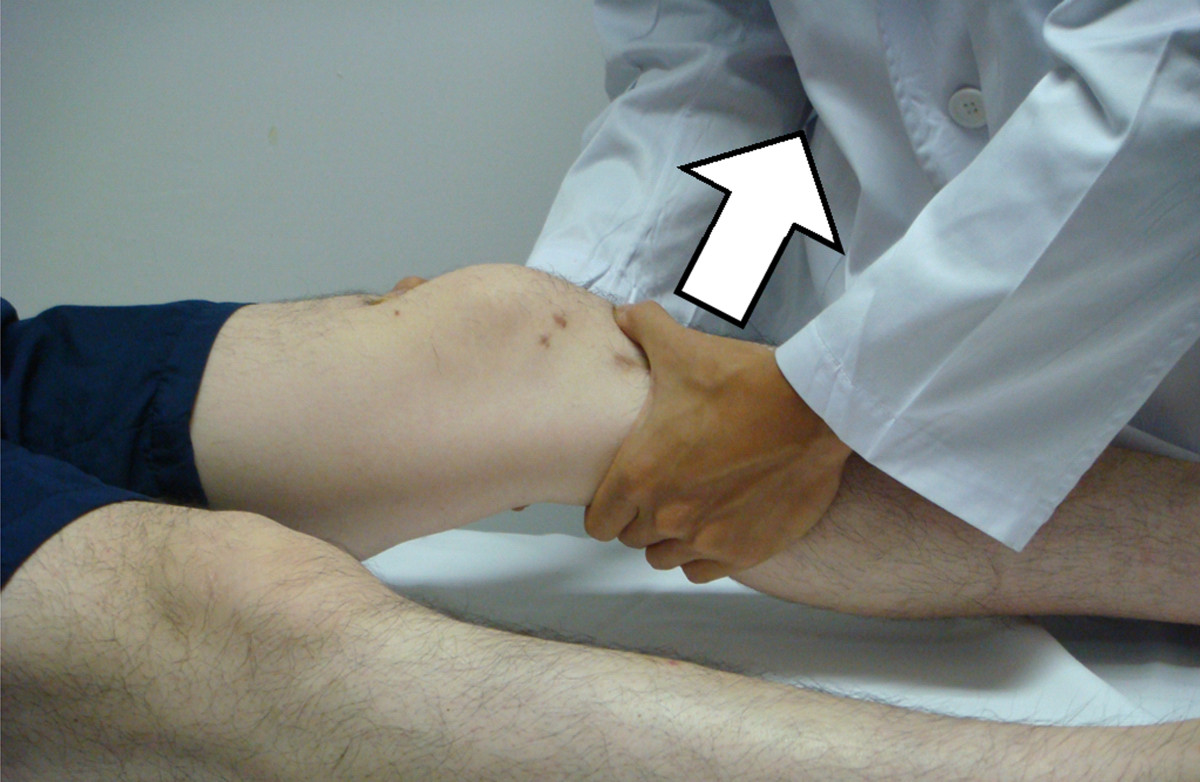
Lachman test

The Lachman test is a clinical test used to diagnose injury of the anterior cruciate ligament (ACL). It is recognized as reliable, sensitive, and usually superior to the anterior drawer test.

== Description ==
The knee is flexed at 15 degrees with the patient supine. The examiner should place one hand behind the tibia and the other grasping the patient's thigh. It is important that the examiner's thumb be on the tibial tuberosity. The tibia is pulled forward to assess the amount of anterior motion of the tibia in comparison to the femur. An intact ACL should prevent forward translational movement ("firm endpoint") while an ACL-deficient knee will demonstrate increased forward translation without a decisive endpoint - a soft or mushy endpoint indicative of a positive test. More than about 2 mm of anterior translation compared to the uninvolved knee suggests a torn ACL ("soft endpoint"), as does 10 mm of total anterior translation. An instrument called a "KT-1000" can be used to determine the magnitude of movement in millimetres. This test can be done in either an on-field evaluation in acute injury, or in a clinical setting when a patient presents for follow-up with knee pain.

== Interpretation ==
The test may be negative in chronic ruptures as the ACL stump can scar to the PCL.

== History and etymology ==
The test is named after orthopaedic surgeon John Lachman, late Chairman of the Department of Orthopaedic Surgery and Sports Medicine at Temple University School of Medicine in Philadelphia, Pennsylvania. The original description was submitted by one of his colleagues, JS Torg.
