= Hahnemann University Hospital =

- American Academic Health System

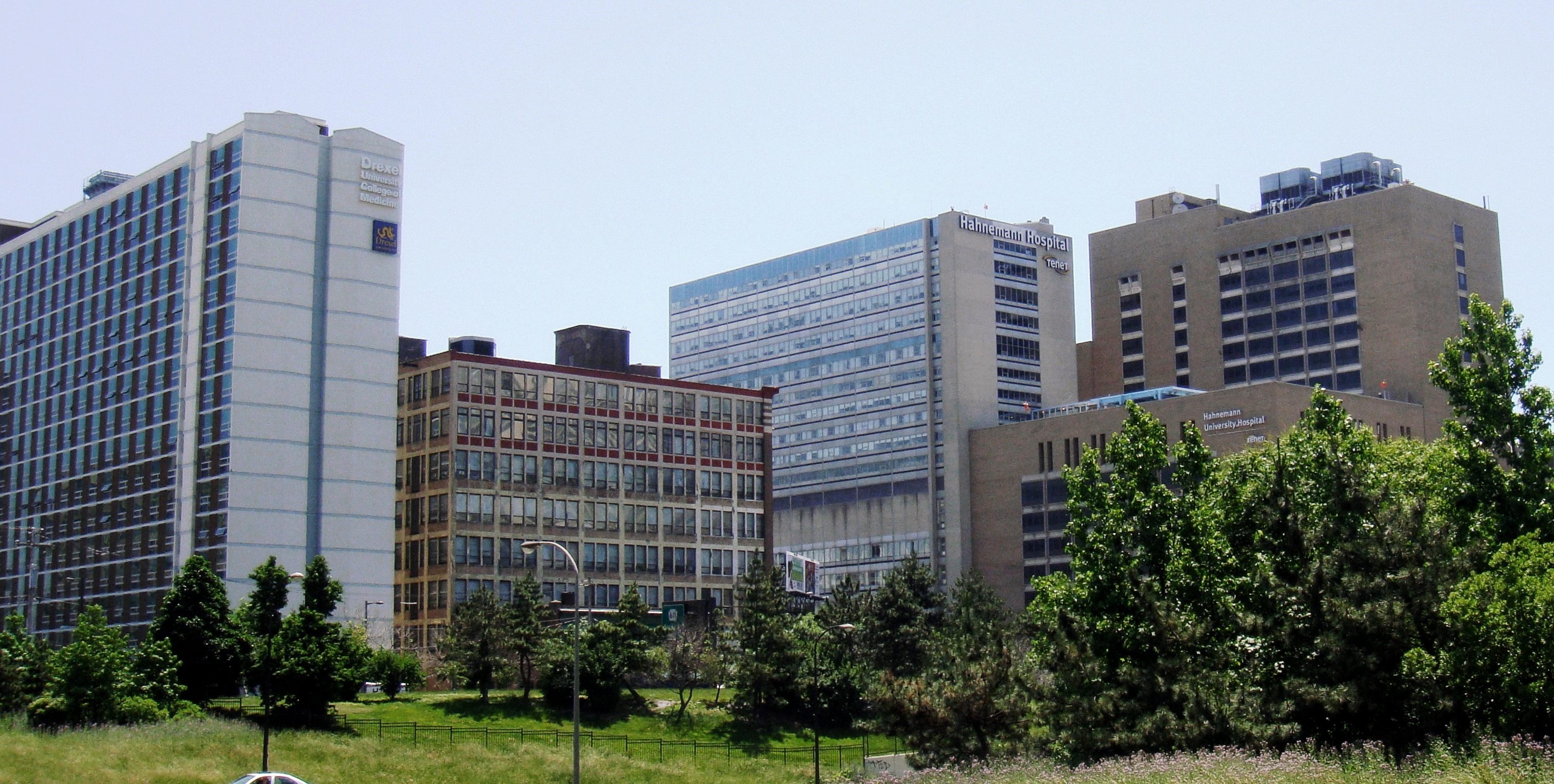

- Location within Pennsylvania Location within Philadelphia

Geography
- Location: 230 N. Broad Street, Philadelphia, Pennsylvania, U.S.
- Coordinates: 39.957°N 75.163°W

Organisation
- Type: Teaching
- Affiliated university: Drexel University College of Medicine

Helipads
- Helipad: FAA LID: 1PS7
Number	Length		Surface
Number	ft	m	Surface
H1	70	21	Concrete, Rooftop

History
- Founded: 1885

Links
- Website: www.hahnemannhospital.com
- Lists: Hospitals in U.S.

Hahnemann University Hospital was a tertiary care center in Center City Philadelphia. It was the teaching hospital of Drexel University College of Medicine. Established in 1885, it was for most of its history the main teaching hospital associated with its namesake medical school, Hahnemann Medical College and Hospital, founded in 1848 and named for Samuel Hahnemann, the founder of homeopathy. Hahnemann University Hospital was fully accredited by the Joint Commission on Accreditation of Healthcare Organizations.

Hahnemann University Hospital, located at the southwest corner of Broad and Vine streets, was also affiliated with St. Christopher's Hospital for Children in North Philadelphia.

The hospital was owned by American Academic Health System, an affiliate of Paladin Healthcare. The sale was completed on January 12, 2018. Under American Academic Health System, Hahnemann's financial condition worsened, with the hospital losing roughly $3 million a month. On June 26, 2019, American Academic Health announced that because of unsustainable financial losses, Hahnemann Hospital would close in September 2019.

The union representing 800 registered nurses who worked at Hahnemann appealed to Philadelphia Mayor Jim Kenney, the Philadelphia City Council, the Pennsylvania General Assembly and Pennsylvania Governor Tom Wolf to keep the hospital open, but to no avail. The closure of the hospital resulted in the ACGME displacing 574 physicians who were in training as residents and fellows, the largest such displacement in U.S. history.

In March 2020, public health authorities attempted to reopen the hospital to provide additional beds during the COVID-19 pandemic.

== History ==
Hahnemann University Hospital logo

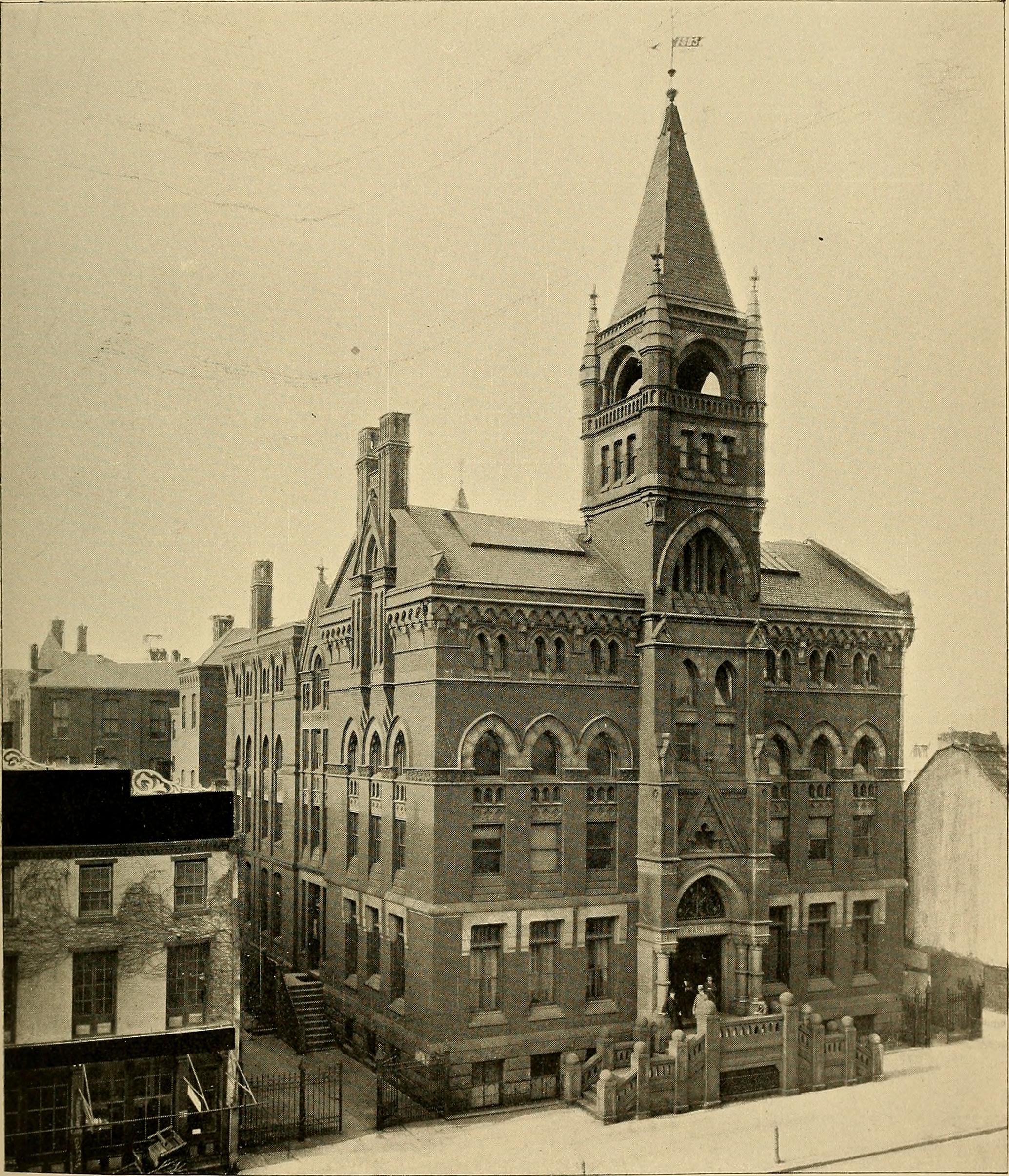
Hahnemann Medical College and Hospital of Philadelphia in 1898

=== Early History ===
The Hahnemann Medical College and Hospital, founded in 1848 as the Homeopathic Medical College of Pennsylvania, was located on North 15th Street in Philadelphia until 1928. It was the first homeopathic medical college in the United States.

After the completion in 1928 of what is now its South Tower, with its art-deco front doors facing Broad Street, Hahnemann moved one block east to its current location. This South Tower was the first skyscraper teaching-hospital in the United States.

=== Expansion ===
In the 1960s and 1970s Hahnemann Medical College and Hospital was home to NSF-funded summer science educational programs for high school students interested in medicine and other scientific areas. These were run under the aegis of retired Hahnemann cardiothoracic surgeon Victor P. Satinsky, MD, and included SSTP, the summer student science training program, and APT, the advanced preceptorship program.

In 1979 Hahnemann Medical College and Hospital, needing more space, completed construction of the North Tower adjacent to the 1928 South Tower. The North Tower housed Hahnemann's emergency department, trauma center, patient care floors, and other core services. It connects by hallway to the New College Building facing 15th Street.

Hahnemann's Charles C. Wolferth Trauma Center, completed in 1986, was Philadelphia's first designated-Level I Trauma Center for adults.

The Hahnemann University Hospital campus consists of six buildings: North Tower, South Tower, the Bobst Building, the Feinstein Building, the New College Building, and Klahr Auditorium.

In 1988, Allegheny purchased the Medical College of Pennsylvania, the former Women's Medical College of Pennsylvania, founded in 1850.

=== Consolidation ===
In 1993, the schools combined to become MCP Hahnemann University School of Medicine. Also in 1993, Allegheny Health Education and Research Foundation purchased Hahnemann Medical College and Hospital. Hahnemann briefly became Allegheny University of the Health Sciences.

== MCP Hahnemann University and Drexel University College of Medicine ==
The Medical College of Pennsylvania merged with Hahnemann University in 1993, creating four fully accredited schools: the School of Medicine, Graduate School, School of Allied Health Professions, and the School of Continuing Education. In 1993, the college became the first medical school in the country to completely integrate women's health issues into its curriculum instead of an occasional lecture or optional elective. Also in that year MCP and Hahnemann University became part of Allegheny Health Education and Research Foundation and were integrated into the Allegheny University of the Health Sciences, which included facilities in Pittsburgh, Pennsylvania.

However, in 1998, Allegheny Health Education and Research Foundation, which owned eight Philadelphia hospitals, collapsed in the nation's largest bankruptcy of a non-profit health care organization and only bankruptcy of a medical school. In 1998, Allegheny Health Education and Research Foundation declared bankruptcy. Tenet Healthcare Corporation acquired its holdings, including MCP Hahnemann University School of Medicine, Hahnemann Hospital, MCP Hospital, and other regional teaching-hospitals associated with MCP Hahnemann, including St. Christopher's Hospital for Children and Warminster Hospital.

In October 1998, in an historic reorganization, the Allegheny Health Education and Research Foundation hospitals were sold to Tenet Healthcare Corporation, a for-profit hospital corporation based in Texas. A new non-profit corporation, Philadelphia Health & Education Corporation (PHEC), was created under the name MCP Hahnemann University. Drexel University was hired as the university's operator.

On August 3, 2000, former US President Gerald R. Ford was admitted to Hahnemann Hospital after suffering minor strokes while attending the 2000 Republican National Convention. He made a quick recovery and was soon released.

After successfully operating MCP Hahnemann University for three and a half years, the Drexel Board of Trustees unanimously agreed to make its relationship with MCP Hahnemann permanent. On July 1, 2002, two of the MCP Hahnemann schools — the College of Nursing and Health Professions and the School of Public Health — formally became integrated with Drexel, and PHEC continued to operate as a legal affiliate of Drexel under its new name, Drexel University College of Medicine. Shortly thereafter, the Secretary of Education for the Commonwealth of Pennsylvania approved the transfer to Drexel University of all degree-granting authority that had previously been vested in MCP Hahnemann University. As a result, all students of the former MCP Hahnemann University became Drexel students and all alumni became affiliated with Drexel as well.

== Services provided ==
Hahnemann Hospital specialized in:

- Heart, Kidney and liver transplantation
- OB/GYN
- Cardiothoracic Surgery
- Trauma
- Medical and radiation oncology
- Hepato-pancreato-biliary (HPB) program
- Minimally invasive robotic surgery
- Neonatal intensive care unit, Level III
- Bariatric surgery
- Bloodless medicine and surgery
- Neurology and neurosurgery
- Orthopedics
- Pulmonary medicine and sleep center
- Urology
- Bone marrow transplantation
- Renal dialysis

== Sale and closure ==
After divesting or closing all legacy Allegheny Health Education and Research Foundation hospitals, Tenet entered into a definitive agreement to sell its remaining Philadelphia assets — Hahnemann and St. Christopher's — to American Academic Health System, a newly formed affiliate of Paladin Healthcare. The definitive agreement was announced in September 2017, with the sale finalized in January 2018.

The hospital was owned by American Academic Health System, an affiliate of Paladin Healthcare. The sale of Dallas-based for-profit Tenet Healthcare's remaining Philadelphia assets was completed on January 12, 2018.

Under American Academic Health System, Hahnemann's financial condition worsened, with the hospital losing roughly $3 million a month. Joel Freedman, CEO of American Academic Health System, publicly stated that Hahnemann was on the brink of closure unless it found financial support from Pennsylvania or Drexel University College of Medicine. As a way to stem ongoing losses, American Academic Health System laid off hundreds of employees throughout 2018 and 2019, closed outpatient offices, and eliminated clinical services. In addition to the hospital's financial turmoil, there was constant turnover in hospital leadership, with the hospital going through five CEOs in the course of a year.

Hahnemann University Hospital announced that it was closing on June 26, 2019, and diverted trauma patients from its emergency room on June 30, 2019. A day later Philadelphia Academic Health System, the hospital's owner, filed for Chapter 11 bankruptcy. The hospital stopped delivering babies on July 12, 2019 and closed their emergency room August 16, 2019 The hospital was part of the bankruptcy of City Center Healthcare.

On June 26, 2019, American Academic Health announced that because of unsustainable financial losses, Hahnemann Hospital would close in September 2019. The union representing 800 registered nurses who worked at Hahnemann appealed to Philadelphia Mayor Jim Kenney, the Philadelphia City Council, the Pennsylvania General Assembly and Pennsylvania Governor Tom Wolf to keep the hospital open, but to no avail. On June 27, 2019, Governor Wolf and the Pennsylvania Department of Health issued a cease and desist and ordered Hahnemann to not take any action toward the hospital's closure until regulators approved a closure plan. On June 29, 2019, Hahnemann withdrew its Level 1 trauma designation. The closure of the hospital resulted in the ACGME displacing 574 physicians who were in training as residents and fellows, the largest such displacement in U.S. history.

In March 2020, public health authorities attempted to reopen the hospital to provide additional beds during the COVID-19 pandemic. At first the facility's owner, Joel Freedman, wanted the city to buy it at market rates. Later he offered to rent it to the city and asked the equivalent of $5.7 million for 6 months upfront. Mayor Jim Kenney accused the owners of "trying to make a buck" from the emergency. On March 27, after Temple University offered use of the Liacouras Center and other facilities as hospital space at no cost to the city, Mayor Kenney announced that the city was no longer pursuing negotiations with the owners of Hahnemann.

== Key milestones and achievements ==
- In 1963, Hahnemann University Hospital performed the Philadelphia region's first kidney transplant.
- In 1976, physicians at Hahnemann performed one of the region's first bone marrow transplants.
- In 1986, Hahnemann became the region's first designated Level One adult trauma center, and University MedEvac became the region's first air medical program.
- In 2001, Hahnemann performed the region's first artificial heart implant.
- In 2016, Hahnemann became the first hospital in the region to offer HOPE Act organ transplantation services. In the same year, the hospital became the first academic medical center in the Philadelphia region to offer a transgender surgical program.
- In 2017, Hahnemann became the first academic medical center in the Philadelphia region and the second in the United States to offer a transgender surgery fellowship.
- On June 30, 2019, Philadelphia Academic Health System, LLC, (the current operators of Hahnemann hospital) filed for bankruptcy in Delaware Federal Bankruptcy Court case # 19–11467.

== In popular culture ==
Hahnemann University Hospital's façade has appeared in numerous TV shows, including It's Always Sunny in Philadelphia, The League, Cold Case, NCIS: Los Angeles and The Mindy Project.

Grace Kelly was born at Hahnemann on November 12, 1929.

Supermodel Gia Carangi was admitted to Hahnemann Hospital, where she subsequently died of AIDS. Hahnemann was mentioned in her biography, "Thing of Beauty: The Tragedy of Supermodel Gia" by Stephen Fried.
