= St. Christopher's Hospital for Children =

Geography
- Location: 3601 A Street, Philadelphia, Pennsylvania, U.S.
- Coordinates: 40.0066°N 75.1245°W

Organisation
- Type: Teaching
- Affiliated university: Drexel University College of Medicine Temple University School of Medicine

Services
- Emergency department: Level I Pediatric Trauma Center
- Beds: 189

History
- Founded: 1875

Links
- Website: http://www.stchristophershospital.com/

St. Christopher's Hospital for Children is a pediatric acute care hospital located in Philadelphia, Pennsylvania. The hospital has 188 beds and is affiliated with both the Drexel University College of Medicine and the Temple University School of Medicine. The hospital provides comprehensive pediatric specialties and subspecialties to pediatric patients aged 0–21 throughout eastern Pennsylvania and is one of the oldest full-service hospitals in the United States totally dedicated to the care of children.

St. Christopher's Hospital for Children also features a Level 1 Pediatric Trauma Center, one of four Pediatric Trauma Centers in the state.

== History ==
=== 19th century ===
On November 30, 1875, founder William H. Bennett, MD, opened St. Christopher's Hospital as a charitable ambulatory pediatric clinic.

=== 20th century ===
Over the years, the hospital added several buildings before outgrowing its quarters and in 1990, the hospital relocated to its present location on Erie Avenue and Front Street. This facility includes an acute care hospital, a medical office building, a teaching and research center and research laboratories.

=== 21st century ===
St. Christopher's Hospital for Children operates several satellite offices throughout the Greater Philadelphia region and southern New Jersey. These include primary care offices and pediatric specialty care centers in Yardley, Pennsylvania, Northeast Philadelphia, East Falls, Pennsylvania, Reading, Pennsylvania, and Washington Township, New Jersey.

The Pediatric Residency at St. Christopher's is top ranked. Each year, St. Christopher's Hospital for Children receives thousands of applications to its Pediatric Residency Program from which 300 are selected to interview. From this group, St. Christopher's selects 24 PL-1 residents through the National Resident Matching Program.

After the bankruptcy of Hahnemann University Hospital, St. Christopher's Hospital for Children was sold to Drexel University and Tower Health for $50 million. The purchase happened in 2019 and included the provision that the hospital would keep its 700 employees.

== Historic milestones ==
- 1940: established the nation's first child life/play therapy program housed in a children's medical center.
- 1965: discovery of a congenital immunodeficiency, later known as DiGeorge syndrome.
- 1968: the hospital performed its first open heart case.
- 1971: surgeons performed the Philadelphia metropolitan area’s first pediatric kidney transplant.
- 1987: performed the Delaware Valley's first combined liver/kidney transplant.
- 1989: became the first hospital in the world to use oxygen-rich liquid ventilation to help premature newborns breathe.
- 1990: became the first hospital in the Philadelphia metropolitan area to use electrical mapping to locate and remove a brain tumor in a pediatric patient.
- 1993: performed a heart transplant on the Delaware Valley's youngest patient – a 4-day-old infant.
- 2009: the hospital achieved Magnet status from the American Nurses Credentialing Center.
- 2017: the hospital is sold from Tenet Healthcare Corp to American Academic Health System, an affiliate of Paladin Healthcare.
- 2015: St. Christopher's Hospital celebrates 140 years of service.
- 2019: St. Christopher's Hospital for Children purchased by Tower Health and Drexel University

The hospital appears in the plot of Third and Indiana, a 1994 novel by Steve Lopez. In the novel, the main character, Gabriel Santoro, critically injured by a bullet from a drug lord, is taken to St. Christopher's, where he dies of his injuries.

== Clinical services and programs ==
St. Christopher's Hospital for Children offers health care services for children from birth through 21 years of age. Pediatric services include sub-specialties such as cardiology, endocrinology, gastroenterology, nephrology, neurology, pulmonology, oncology, and rheumatology. The hospital also provides pediatric surgical services such as cardiothoracic surgery, general surgery, neurosurgery, orthopaedic surgery, and plastic and reconstructive surgery. The hospital operates a Level I Pediatric Trauma Center, a Level IV Neonatal Intensive Care Unit and a pediatric burn center. Other services and programs include minimally invasive surgery, cystic fibrosis center, sickle cell anemia care and research center, AIDS/HIV program, sleep center and fetal evaluation center.
