= Shocker (gesture) =

Obscene hand gesture

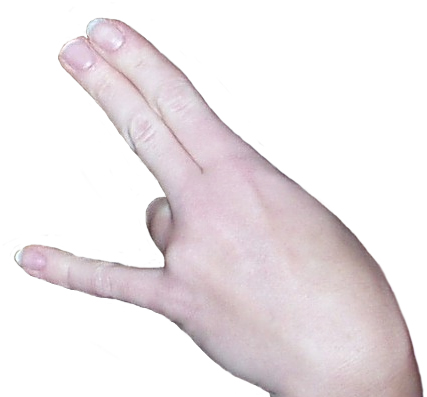
Example of the shocker

In the United States, the Shocker is a hand gesture with a sexual connotation. The index, middle, and little fingers are extended, while the ring finger is curled or bent down. The index and middle fingers are held together. The thumb may be tucked against the palm or – in a variation on the gesture – extended.

The gesture refers to the sex act of inserting the index and middle fingers into a partner's vagina and the little finger into their anus, the latter of which is presumed to "shock" them. If the thumb is extended, it refers to simultaneously stimulating their clitoris. The hand gesture is not necessarily practical for the sex act it represents, however.

The standard form of the gesture is known colloquially as "two in the pink, one in the stink", referring to the number of fingers inserted into the vagina and anus respectively.

== See also ==
- Shaka sign
