= Dorsal artery =

Dorsal artery may refer to:

- Dorsal artery of clitoris
- Dorsal artery of the penis
- Dorsal digital arteries of hand
- Dorsal digital arteries of foot
- Dorsal interosseous artery also known as posterior interosseous artery
- Dorsal metacarpal arteries
- Dorsal metatarsal arteries
- Dorsal nasal artery
- Dorsal pancreatic artery
- Dorsal scapular artery
- Dorsal spinal artery also known as posterior spinal artery
- Dorsalis pedis artery
- First dorsal metatarsal artery
