= Digital arteries =

Digital arteries are arteries that relate to fingers and toes.

These include:

- Common palmar digital arteries
- Common plantar digital arteries
- Dorsal digital arteries of foot
- Dorsal digital arteries of hand
- Proper palmar digital arteries
- Proper plantar digital arteries
