= Digit (anatomy) =

One of several most distal parts of a limb, such as fingers or toes

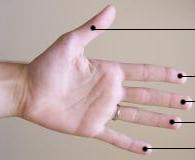
Hand

A digit is one of several most distal parts of a limb, such as fingers or toes, present in many vertebrates.

== Names ==
Some languages have different names for hand and foot digits (English: respectively "finger" and "toe", German: "Finger" and "Zeh", French: "doigt" and "orteil").

In other languages, e.g. Arabic, Russian, Polish, Spanish, Portuguese, Italian, Czech, Tagalog, Turkish, Bulgarian, and Persian, there are no specific one-word names for fingers and toes; these are called "digit of the hand" or "digit of the foot" instead. In Japanese, yubi (指) can mean either, depending on context.

== Human digits ==
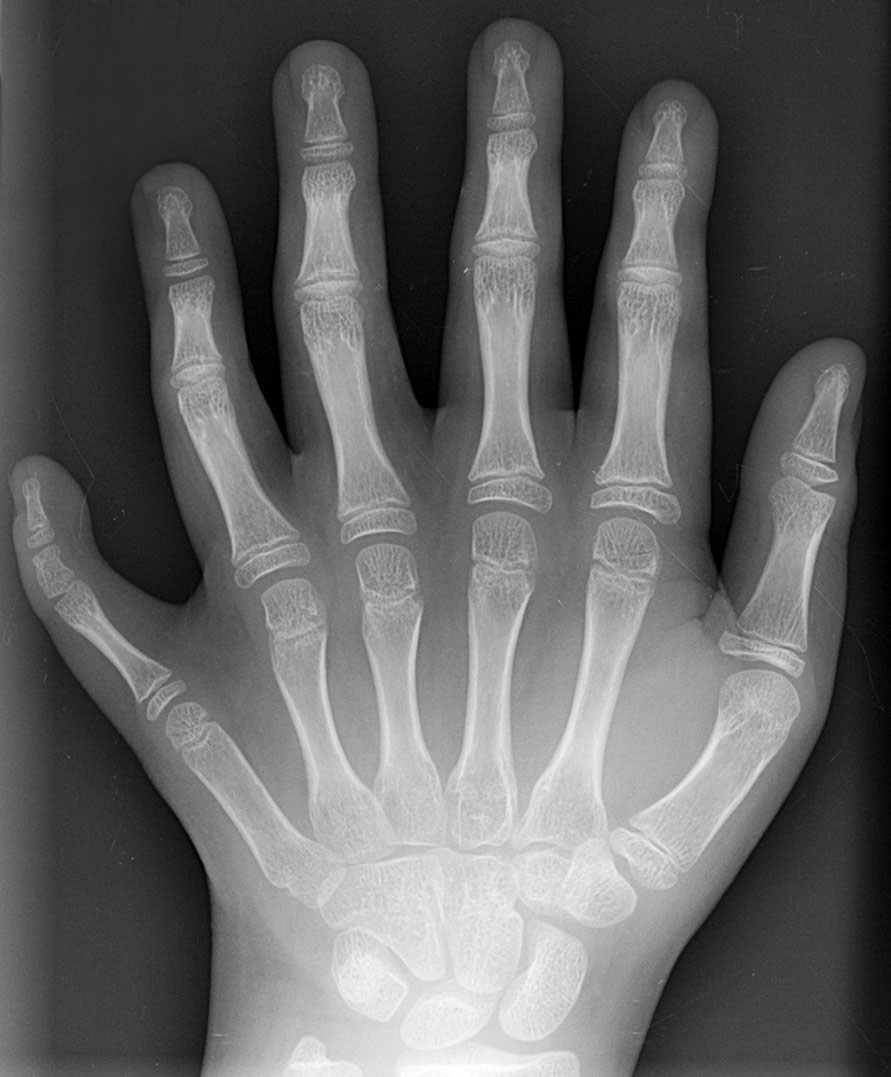
Radiogram of a polydactyl left hand.

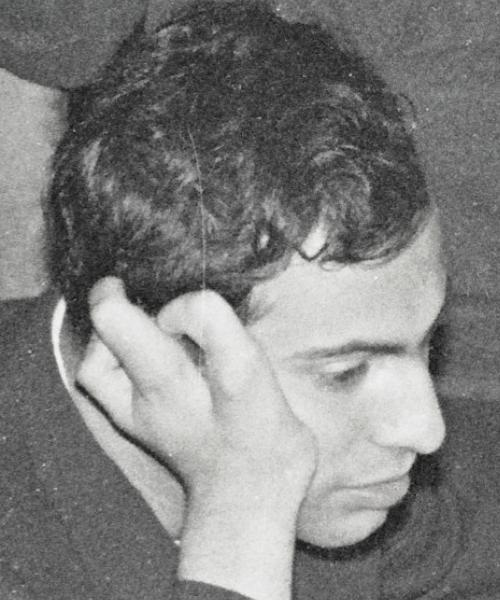
Mikhail Tal at the 1961 European chess championship.

Humans normally have five digits on each extremity. Each digit is formed by several bones called phalanges, surrounded by soft tissue. Human fingers normally have a nail at the distal phalanx. The phenomenon of polydactyly occurs when extra digits are present; fewer digits than normal are also possible, for instance in ectrodactyly. Whether such a mutation can be surgically corrected, and whether such correction is indicated, is case-dependent. For instance the former chess world champion Mikhail Tal lived all his life with only three right-hand fingers.

Fingers	Thumb	Index	Middle	Ring	Little
Toes	Hallux	Long	Third	Fourth	Fifth

== Brain representation ==
Each finger has an orderly somatotopic representation on the cerebral cortex in the somatosensory cortex area 3b, part of area 1 and a distributed, overlapping representation in the supplementary motor area and primary motor area.

The somatosensory cortex representation of the hand is a dynamic reflection of the fingers on the external hand: in syndactyly people have a clubhand of webbed, shortened fingers. However, not only are the fingers of their hands fused, but the cortical maps of their individual fingers also form a club hand. The fingers can be surgically divided to make a more useful hand. Surgeons did this at the Institute of Reconstructive Plastic Surgery in New York to a 32-year-old man with the initials O. G.. They touched O. G.’s fingers before and after surgery while using MRI brain scans. Before the surgery, the fingers mapped onto his brain were fused close together; afterward, the maps of his individual fingers did indeed separate and take the layout corresponding to a normal hand.

== Evolution ==
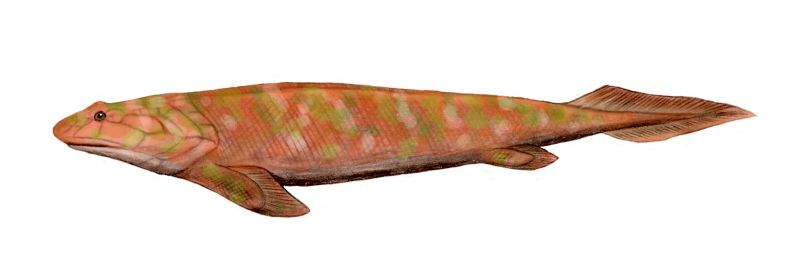
A reconstruction of Panderichthys.

Two ideas about the homology of arms, hands, and digits exist.

- That digits are unique to tetrapods; and
- That homologous antecedents to digits were present in the fins of early sarcopterygian fish.

Until recently, few transitional forms were known to elaborate on this transition. One particular example is Panderichthys, a coastal fish from the Devonian period 385 million years ago. Prior to 2008, Panderichthys was interpreted as having a fin terminating at a single large plate surrounded by lepidotrichia (fin rays). However, a 2008 study by Boisvert et al. determined that this was mistaken. They discovered that the final bony portion of the fin in Panderichthys is split into at least four fin radials, bones similar to rudimentary fingers.

Thus, in the evolution of tetrapods a shift occurred where the outermost rays of the fins were lost and replaced by the inner radials, which evolve into the earliest digits. This change is consistent with additional evidence from the embryology of actinopterygians, sharks and lungfish. Pre-existing distal radials in these modern fish develop in a very similar way to the digits of tetrapods.

Several rows of digit-like distal fin radials are present in Tiktaalik, a much more complete Devonian vertebrate described in 2006. Though frequently described as the missing link between fishes and tetrapods, the exact relationship between Panderichthys, Tiktaalik, and tetrapods are yet to be fully resolved. Tiktaalik had some features of the forefin more similar to earlier fish, such as a large ulnare and a distinct axis of larger bones down the middle of the fin. According to Boisvert et al. (2008), "It is difficult to say whether this character distribution implies that Tiktaalik is autapomorphic, that Panderichthys and tetrapods are convergent, or that Panderichthys is closer to tetrapods than Tiktaalik. At any rate, it demonstrates that the fish–tetrapod transition was accompanied by significant character incongruence in functionally important structures."^{p. 638.}

Digit-like radials are also known in the rhizodont fish Sauripterus, though this is likely a case of convergent evolution. Elpistostege, a tetrapodomorph fish closely related to Tiktaalik, preserves one of the most tetrapod-like hands in any prehistoric fish. The hand of Elpisostege had 19 distal fin radials arranged into blocks up to four radials long. These sequential blocks of radials are very similar to digits.

== Bird and theropod dinosaur digits ==
Birds and theropod dinosaurs (from which birds evolved) have three digits on their hands. The two digits that are missing are different: the bird hand (embedded in the wing) is thought to derive from the second, third and fourth digits of the ancestral five-digit hand. In contrast, the theropod dinosaurs seem to have the first, second and third digits. Recently a Jurassic theropod intermediate fossil Limusaurus has been found in the Junggar Basin in western China that has a complex mix: it has a first digit stub and full second, third and fourth digits but its wrist bones are like those that are associated with the second, third and fourth digits while its finger bones are those of the first, second and third digits. This suggests the evolution of digits in birds resulted from a "shift in digit identity [that] characterized early stages of theropod evolution"

== See also ==
- Polydactyly in early tetrapods
- Polydactyly
