= Finger snapping =

Auditory hand action

A video of finger snapping

Alternative snapping technique

Snapping (or clicking) is the act of creating a snapping or clicking sound with one's fingers. Primarily, this is done by building tension between the thumb and another (middle, index, or ring) finger and then moving the other finger forcefully downward, so it hits the palm of the same hand at a high speed.

A Georgia Institute of Technology study in 2021 analyzed finger snapping, and found that a snap has the highest angular acceleration of any motion produced by the human body. The moving finger reaches this peak acceleration of 1,600,000 degrees per second squared in just seven milliseconds. For reference, the blink of an eye takes place in 150 milliseconds.

== In culture ==
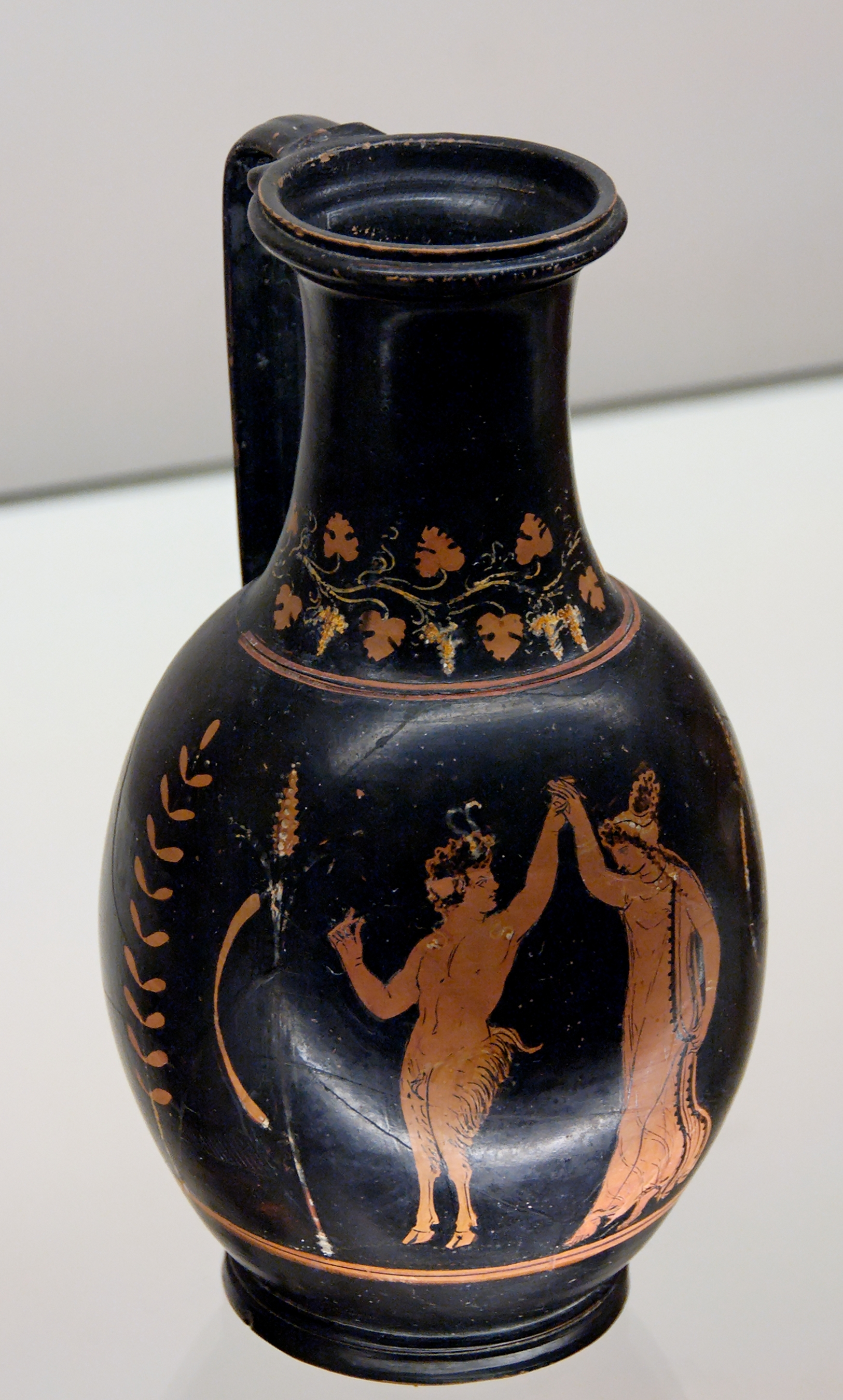
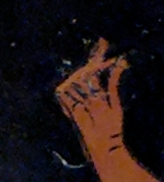
Pan, god of nature and the wild, and a Maenad dancing. Ancient Greek red-figured olpe from Apulia, c. 320–310 BCE. Pan's right hand fingers are in a snapping position.

In Ancient Greece, musicians and dancers snapped their fingers to keep the rhythm and was known with the words "ἀποληκέω" (apolekeo), "ἀποκρότημα" (apokrotema) (from the verb "ἀποκροτέω" - apokroteo, "to snap the fingers") and "ἐπίπταισμα" (epiptaisma). Finger snapping is still common in modern Greece.

Finger snapping may be used as a substitute for hand clapping. A possible reason is that snapping is "less disruptive than clapping during speeches and announcements." The practice of finger snapping is also popular within the poetry slam community, used by the audience as a spontaneous in-the-moment show of support or agreement with what is being shared by the poet. The practice has also seen use at some conferences.

Finger snapping played a prominent part in a series of charity appeal adverts for Make Poverty History in 2005. Many famous faces including Bono, Bob Geldof and Kate Moss took part in the appeals. They wore a white top and Make Poverty History charity wristband and these appeals were filmed in grayscale on a white background, and they would click their fingers in the appeal to represent a child dying from poverty every three seconds in Africa. During the opening of the Philadelphia Live 8 concert, rapper and actor Will Smith led the combined audiences of London, Philadelphia, Berlin, Rome, Paris and Barrie in a synchronised finger snap.

Finger snapping at someone has long been used as a sassy diva gesture, done to express a taunting satisfaction following what one has considered to be an impressive insult or diss. Sometimes finger-snapping is done in rapid succession for emphasis and combined with other types of sassy diva mannerisms, such as swivel-hipping and head-gyrating. It is largely associated with gay men and women, particularly gay black American men and black American women. It was derived in the 1980s and 90s from Black American gay male subcultures.

== In pop culture ==
In the Marvel Cinematic Universe live-action film Avengers: Infinity War (2018), Thanos snaps his fingers causing the Blip. In the live-action film Avengers: Endgame (2019), Bruce Banner and Tony Stark snap their fingers, reversing the Blip and defeating an alternate Thanos, who also snapped his fingers to no effect.

In the manga and anime Fullmetal Alchemist, Colonel Roy Mustang activates his Alchemy by snapping his fingers.

== In music ==
In many cultures, finger snapping is a form of body percussion.

Sounds of a fingersnap also are sampled and used in many disparate genres of music, used mostly as percussion. The works of Angelo Badalamenti exhibit this in the soundtracks to works such as Twin Peaks and Lost Highway, as do the theme song from the television series The Addams Family and that of 77 Sunset Strip.

A subgenre of hip hop known as snap music formed in the early 2000s in the southern United States.

== Persian variant ==
Beshkan (Persian: بشكن), also known as the "Persian snap", is a traditional Iranian finger snap requiring both hands. The snapper creates a clicking noise similar in mechanism to the normal snap but louder in practice.

=== Technique ===
There are two variations of the Persian snap. The most common of the two for a right-handed individual is:

- Place hands together and rotate until the three right hand fingers are at the junction of the hand and fingers.
- Rest the right middle finger on the left hand securely.
- Then using the tension provided by the left thumb, snap the right index finger onto the gap between the junction and right middle finger.
