= Finger =

Digit of the forelimb

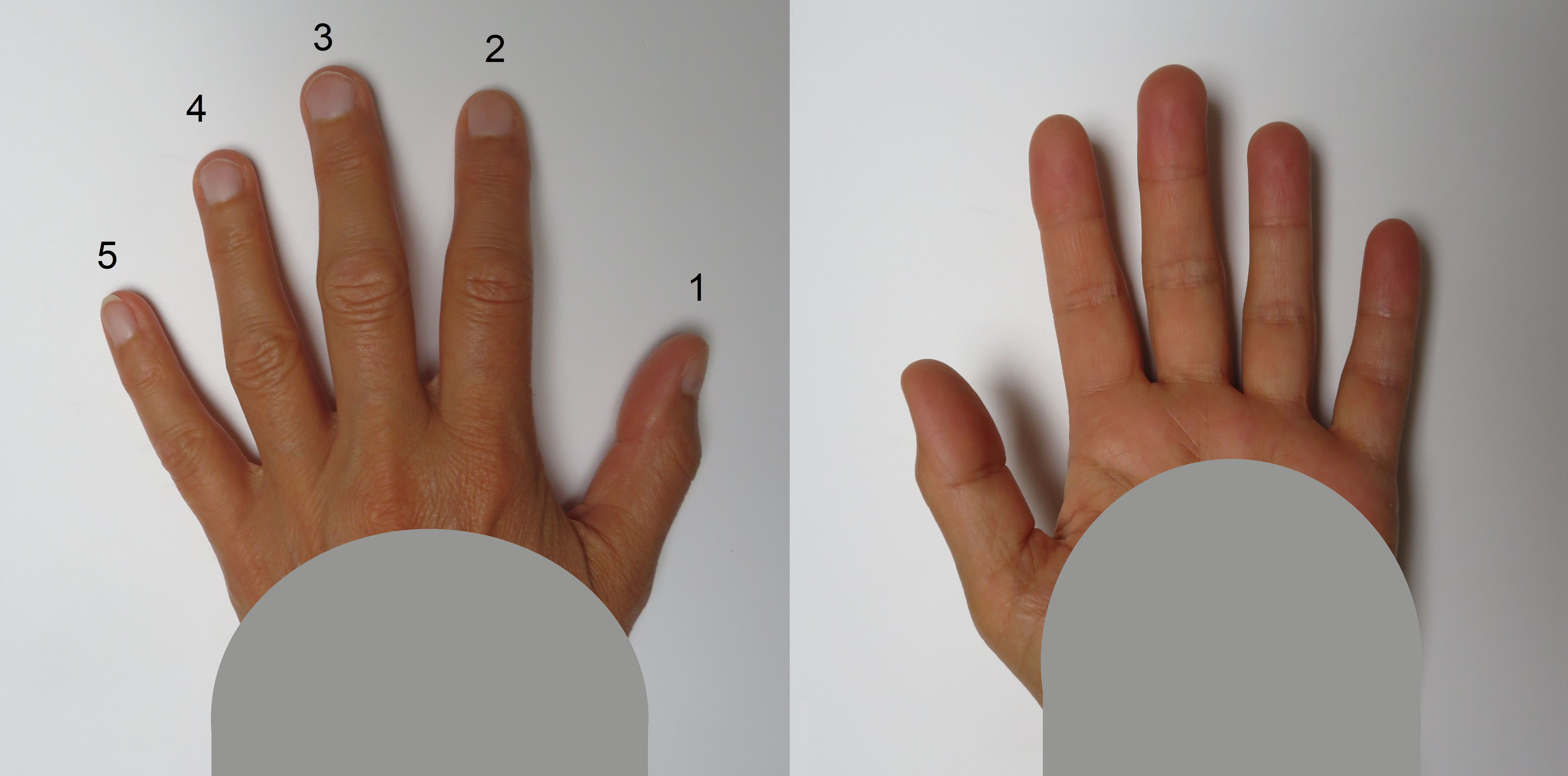
- The fingers of a left hand seen from both sides

Details

Identifiers
- Latin: digiti manus
- MeSH: D005385
- TA98: A01.1.00.030
- TA2: 150
- FMA: 9666

A finger is a prominent, multi-jointed digit on the forelimbs of tetrapod vertebrate animals with prehensile extremities (i.e. hands) such as humans and other primates, and is typically covered with a keratinized nail to protect the end (i.e. fingertip). Most tetrapods have five digits (pentadactyly), digits that are significantly shorter than the metacarpal/metatarsals, are typically referred to as toes; while digits that are notably elongated are called fingers. In humans, the fingers are opposable and have two or three phalanges with fairly good flexional range of motion, serving as an important organ of tactile sensation and fine movements, which are crucial to the dexterity of the hands and the ability to grasp and manipulate objects.

== Humans ==
Usually humans have five digits, the bones of which are termed phalanges, on each hand, although some people have more or fewer than five due to congenital disorders such as polydactyly or oligodactyly, or accidental or intentional amputations. The first digit is the thumb, followed by the index finger, middle finger, ring finger, and little finger or pinkie. According to different definitions, the thumb can be called a finger, or not.

English dictionaries describe finger as meaning either one of the five digits including the thumb, or one of the four digits excluding the thumb (in which case they are numbered from 1 to 4 starting with the index finger closest to the thumb).

=== Structure ===
==== Skeleton ====
Illustration depicting the bones of the human hand

The thumb (connected to the trapezium) is located on one of the sides, parallel to the arm.

The palm has five bones known as metacarpal bones, one to each of the five digits. Human hands contain fourteen digital bones, also called phalanges, or phalanx bones: two in the thumb (the thumb has no middle phalanx) and three in each of the four fingers. These are the distal phalanx, carrying the nail, the middle phalanx, and the proximal phalanx. Joints are formed wherever two or more of these bones meet. Each of the fingers has three joints:

- metacarpophalangeal joint (MCP) – the joint at the base of the finger
- proximal interphalangeal joint (PIP) – the joint in the middle of the finger
- distal interphalangeal joint (DIP) – the joint closest to the fingertip.

Sesamoid bones are small ossified nodes embedded in the tendons to provide extra leverage and reduce pressure on the underlying tissue. Many exist around the palm at the bases of the digits; the exact number varies between different people.

The articulations are: interphalangeal articulations between phalangeal bones, and metacarpophalangeal joints connecting the phalanges to the metacarpal bones.

==== Muscles ====
The precision of finger movements in space and time is highlighted in this motion tracking of two pianists' fingers playing the same piece (slow motion, no sound).

Each finger may flex and extend, abduct and adduct, and so also circumduct. Flexion is by far the strongest movement. In humans, there are two large muscles that produce flexion of each finger, and additional muscles that augment the movement. The muscle bulks that move each finger may be partly blended, and the tendons may be attached to each other by a net of fibrous tissue, preventing completely free movement. Although each finger seems to move independently, moving one finger also moves the other fingers slightly which is called finger interdependence or finger enslaving.

Fingers do not contain muscles (other than arrector pili). The muscles that move the finger joints are in the palm and forearm. The long tendons that deliver motion from the forearm muscles may be observed to move under the skin at the wrist and on the back of the hand.

Muscles of the fingers can be subdivided into extrinsic and intrinsic muscles. The extrinsic muscles are the long flexors and extensors. They are called extrinsic because the muscle belly is located on the forearm.

The fingers have two long flexors, located on the underside of the forearm. They insert by tendons to the phalanges of the fingers. The deep flexor attaches to the distal phalanx, and the superficial flexor attaches to the middle phalanx. The flexors allow for the actual bending of the fingers. The thumb has one long flexor and a short flexor in the thenar muscle group. The human thumb also has other muscles in the thenar group (opponens and abductor brevis muscle), moving the thumb in opposition, making grasping possible.

The extensors are located on the back of the forearm and are connected in a more complex way than the flexors to the dorsum of the fingers. The tendons unite with the interosseous and lumbrical muscles to form the extensorhood mechanism. The primary function of the extensors is to straighten out the digits. The thumb has two extensors in the forearm; the tendons of these form the anatomical snuff box. Also, the index finger and the little finger have an extra extensor, used for instance for pointing. The extensors are situated within six separate compartments. The first compartment contains abductor pollicis longus and extensor pollicis brevis. The second compartment contains extensors carpi radialis longus and brevis. The third compartment contains extensor pollicis longus. The extensor digitorum indicis and extensor digitorum communis are within the fourth compartment. Extensor digiti minimi is in the fifth, and extensor carpi ulnaris is in the sixth.

The intrinsic muscle groups are the thenar and hypothenar muscles (thenar referring to the thumb, hypothenar to the small finger), the dorsal and palmar interossei muscles (between the metacarpal bones) and the lumbrical muscles. The lumbricals arise from the deep flexor (and are special because they have no bony origin) and insert on the dorsal extensor hood mechanism.

==== Skin ====
Aside from the genitals, the fingertips possess the highest concentration of touch receptors and thermoreceptors among all areas of the human skin, making them extremely sensitive to temperature, pressure, vibration, texture and moisture. A study in 2013 suggested fingers can feel nano-scale wrinkles on a seemingly smooth surface, a level of sensitivity not previously recorded. This makes the fingers commonly used sensory probes to ascertain properties of objects encountered in the world, making them prone to injury.

The pulp of a finger is the fleshy mass on the palmar aspect of the extremity of the finger.

==== Fingertip wrinkling in water ====
Although a common phenomenon, the underlying functions and mechanism of fingertip wrinkling following immersion in water are relatively unexplored. Originally it was assumed that the wrinkles were simply the result of the skin swelling in water, but it is now understood that the furrows are caused by the blood vessels constricting due to signalling by the sympathetic nervous system in response to water exposure. One hypothesis for why this occurs, the "rain tread" hypothesis, posits that the wrinkles may help the fingers grip things when wet, possibly being an adaption from a time when humans dealt with rain and dew in forested primate habitats. A 2013 study supporting this hypothesis found that the wrinkled fingertips provided better handling of wet objects but gave no advantage for handling dry objects. However, a 2014 study attempting to reproduce these results was unable to demonstrate any improvement of handling wet objects with wrinkled fingertips.

==== Regrowth of the fingertips ====
Fingertips, after having been torn off children, have been observed to regrow in less than 8 weeks. However, these fingertips do not look the same, although they do look more appealing than a skin graft or a sewn fingertip. No healing occurs if the tear happens below the nail. This works because the distal phalanges are regenerative in youth, and stem cells in the nails create new tissue that ends up as the fingertip.

==== Brain representation ====
Each finger has an orderly somatotopic representation on the cerebral cortex in the somatosensory cortex area 3b, part of area 1 and a distributed, overlapping representations in the supplementary motor area and primary motor area.

The somatosensory cortex representation of the hand is a dynamic reflection of the fingers on the external hand: in syndactyly people have a clubhand of webbed, shortened fingers. However, not only are the fingers of their hands fused, but the cortical maps of their individual fingers also form a club hand. The fingers can be surgically divided to make a more useful hand. Surgeons did this at the Institute of Reconstructive Plastic Surgery in New York to a 32-year-old man with the initials O. G.. They touched O. G.'s fingers before and after surgery while using MRI brain scans. Before the surgery, the fingers mapped onto his brain were fused close together; afterward, the maps of his individual fingers did indeed separate and take the layout corresponding to a normal hand.

=== Clinical significance ===
==== Anomalies, injuries and diseases ====
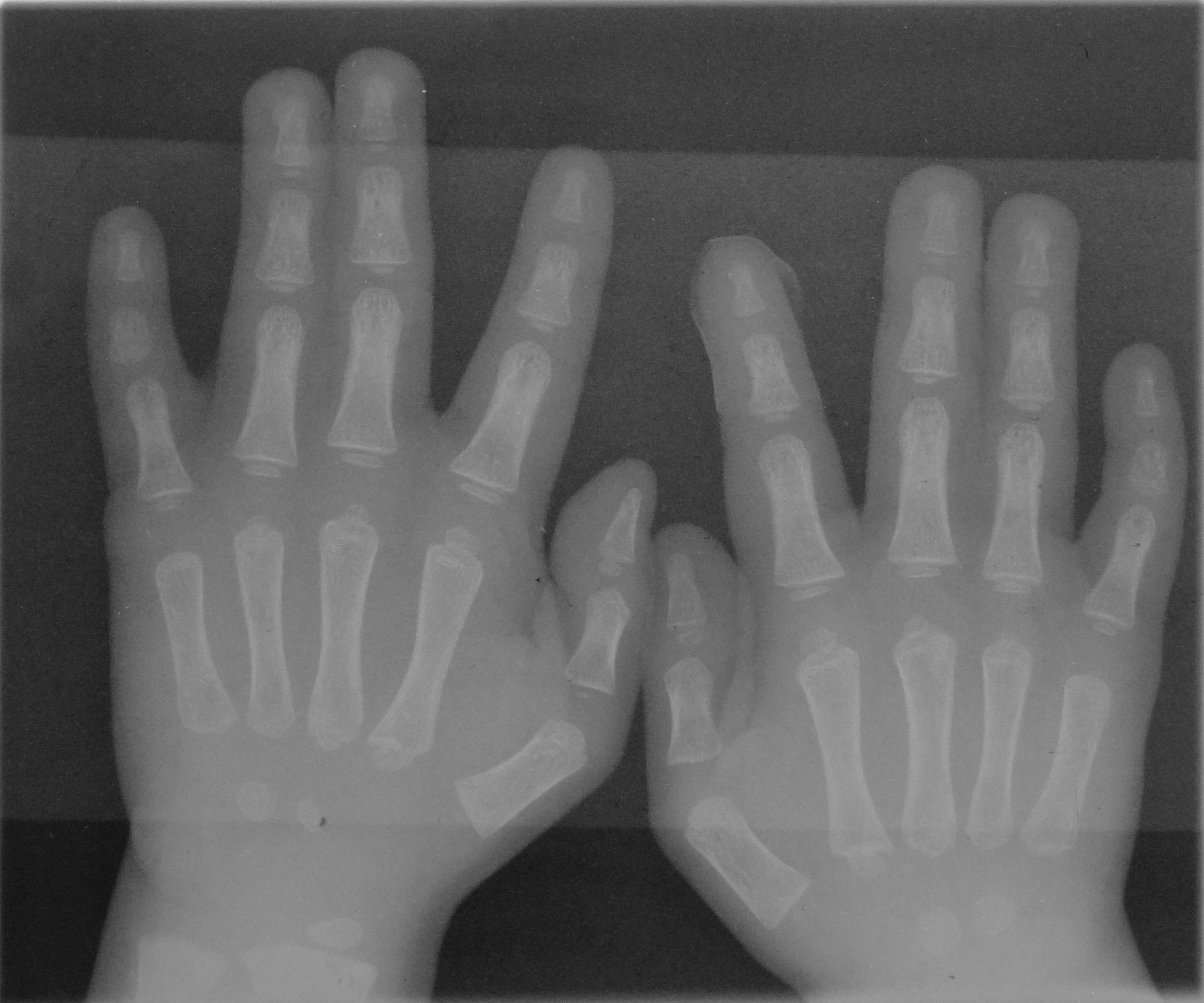
Radiograph of Type 1 Syndactyly

A rare anatomical variation affects 4 to 12 in 10,000 humans, in which the individual has more than the usual number of digits; this is known as polydactyly. A human may also be born without one or more fingers or underdevelopment of some fingers such as symbrachydactyly. Extra fingers can be functional. One individual with seven fingers not only used them but claimed that they "gave him some advantages in playing the piano".

Phalanges are commonly fractured. A damaged tendon can cause significant loss of function in fine motor control, such as with a mallet finger. They can be damaged by cold, including frostbite and non-freezing cold injury (NFCI); and heat, including burns.

The fingers are commonly affected by diseases such as rheumatoid arthritis and gout. Individuals with diabetes often use the fingers to obtain blood samples for regular blood sugar testing. Raynaud's phenomenon and Paroxysmal hand hematoma are neurovascular disorders that affect the fingers.

Research has linked the ratio of lengths between the index and ring fingers to higher levels of testosterone, and to various physical and behavioral traits such as penis length and risk for development of alcohol dependence or video game addiction.

== Land vertebrates ==
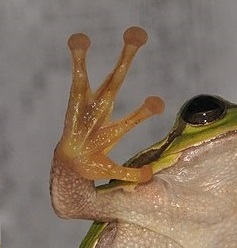
Fingers of a tree frog (amphibian)

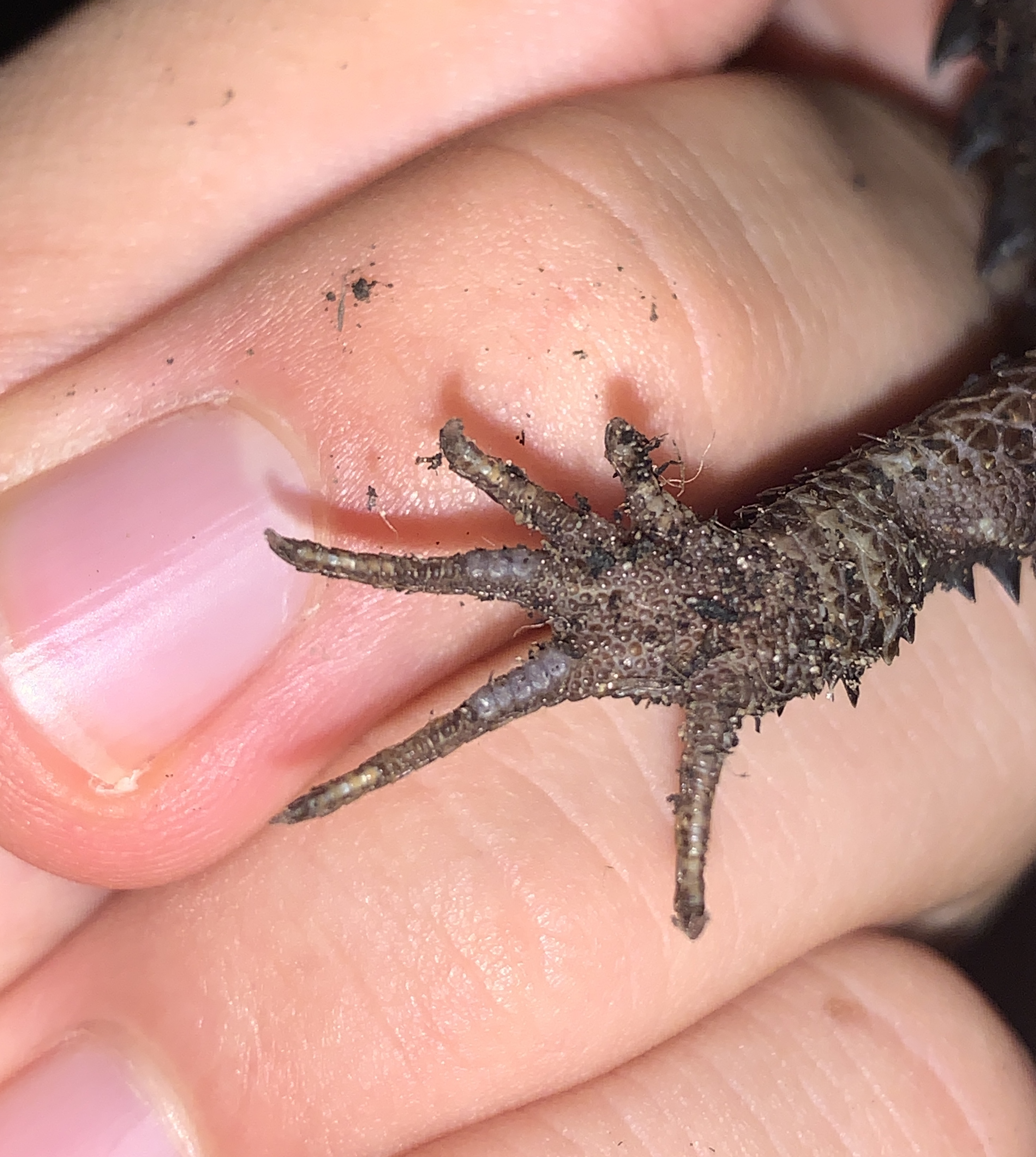
Fingers of a red-eyed crocodile skink (reptile)

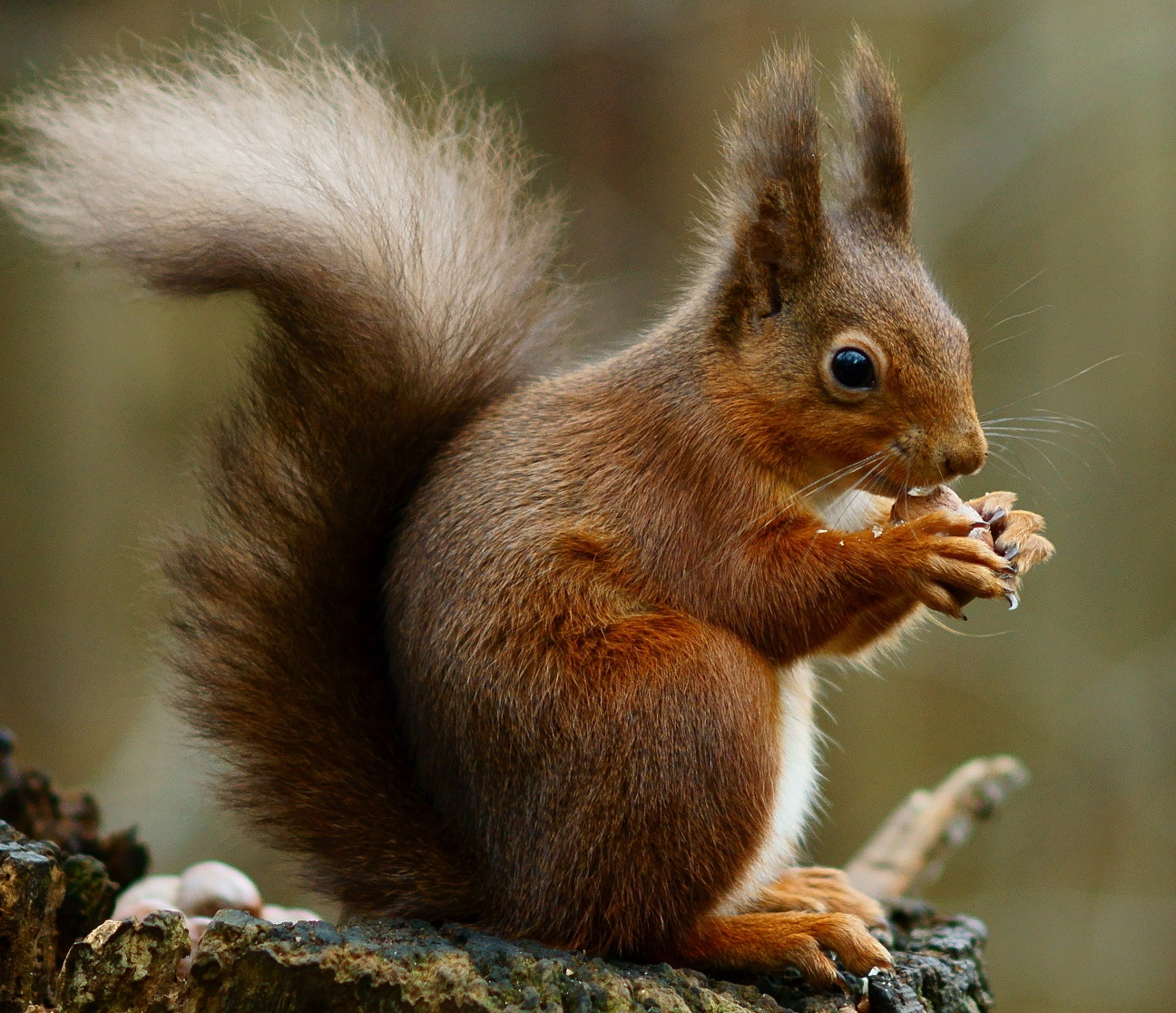
Red squirrel holding food with its fingers (mammal)

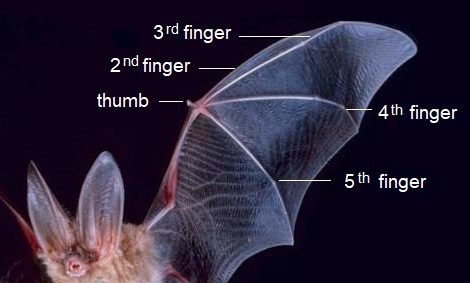
Fingers of a bat (mammal)

As terrestrial vertebrates were evolved from lobe-finned fish, their forelimbs are phylogenetically equivalent to the pectoral fins of fish. Within the taxa of the terrestrial vertebrates, the basic pentadactyl plan, and thus also the metacarpals and phalanges, undergo many variations. Morphologically the different fingers of terrestrial vertebrates are homolog. The wings of birds and those of bats are not homologous, they are analogue flight organs. However, the phalanges within them are homologous.

Chimpanzees have lower limbs that are specialized for manipulation, and (arguably) have fingers (instead of toes) on their lower limbs as well. In the case of primates in general, the digits of the hand are overwhelmingly referred to as "fingers". Primate fingers have both fingernails and fingerprints.

Research has been carried out on the embryonic development of domestic chickens showing that an interdigital webbing forms between the tissues that become the toes, which subsequently regresses by apoptosis. If apoptosis fails to occur, the interdigital skin remains intact. Many animals have developed webbed feet or skin between the fingers from this like the Wallace's flying frog.

== Etymology ==
The English word finger stems from Old English finger, ultimately from Proto-Germanic *fingraz ('finger'). It is cognate with Old Norse fingr, or Old High German fingar. Linguists generally assume that *fingraz is a ro-stem deriving from a previous form *fimfe, ultimately from Proto-Indo-European *pénkʷe ('five').

The name pinkie derives from Dutch pinkje, of uncertain origin. In English only the digits on the hand are known as fingers. However, in some languages the translated version of fingers can mean either the digits on the hand or feet. In English a digit on a foot has the distinct name of toe.

== See also ==
- Finger snapping
