= Supratrochlear lymph nodes =

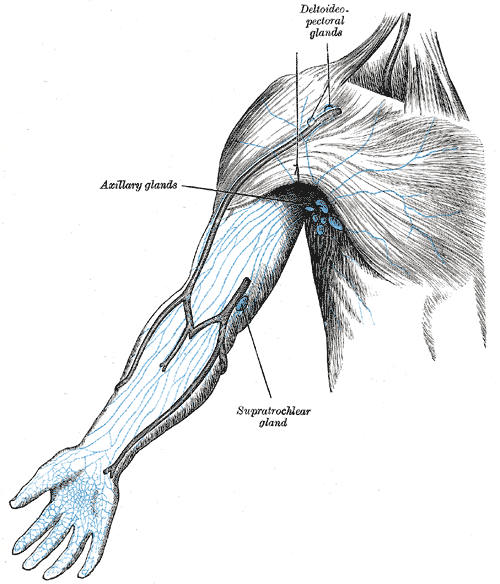
- The superficial lymph glands and lymphatic vessels of the arm (supratrochlear gland labeled at bottom center)

- Regional lymph tissue

Details
- System: Lymphatic system
- Drains to: Lateral lymph nodes

Identifiers
- Latin: nodi lymphoidei supratrochleares

One or two supratrochlear lymph nodes are placed above the medial epicondyle of the humerus, medial to the basilic vein.

Their afferents drain the middle, ring, and little fingers, the medial portion of the hand, and the superficial area over the ulnar side of the forearm; these vessels are, however, in free communication with the other lymphatic vessels of the forearm.

Their efferents accompany the basilic vein and join the deeper vessels.

They are distinguished in Terminologia anatomica from the "epitrochlear" (or "cubital") lymph nodes, but the region is similar.

== Clinical significance ==
The supratrochlear lymph nodes swell up when an infection is detected in the body. They may be palpable.

== Additional images ==
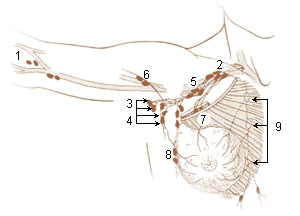
Lymph nodes of the upper limb and breast

== See also ==
- Trochlea of humerus
