= Dorsal digital arteries =

Dorsal digital arteries may refer to:

- Dorsal digital arteries of hand
- Dorsal digital arteries of foot
