= Digitus tertius =

Digitus tertius ('third digit') may refer to:

- Digitus tertius manus, the middle finger
- Digitus tertius pedis, the third toe
