= Digitus II =

Digitus II or second digit can refer to:

- Index finger (digitus II manus)
- Second or long toe (digitus II pedis)
