= Digitus quartus =

Digitus quartus ('fourth digit') may refer to:

- Digitus quartus manus, the ring finger
- Digitus quartus pedis, the fourth toe
