= Digitus minimus =

Digitus minimus literally means smallest digit and can refer to:

- Little finger (fifth finger)
- little toe (fifth toe)
