= Digitus IV =

Digitus IV or fourth digit can refer to:

- Ring finger (digitus IV manus)
- Fourth toe (digitus IV pedis)
