= Index finger =

Second finger of the human hand

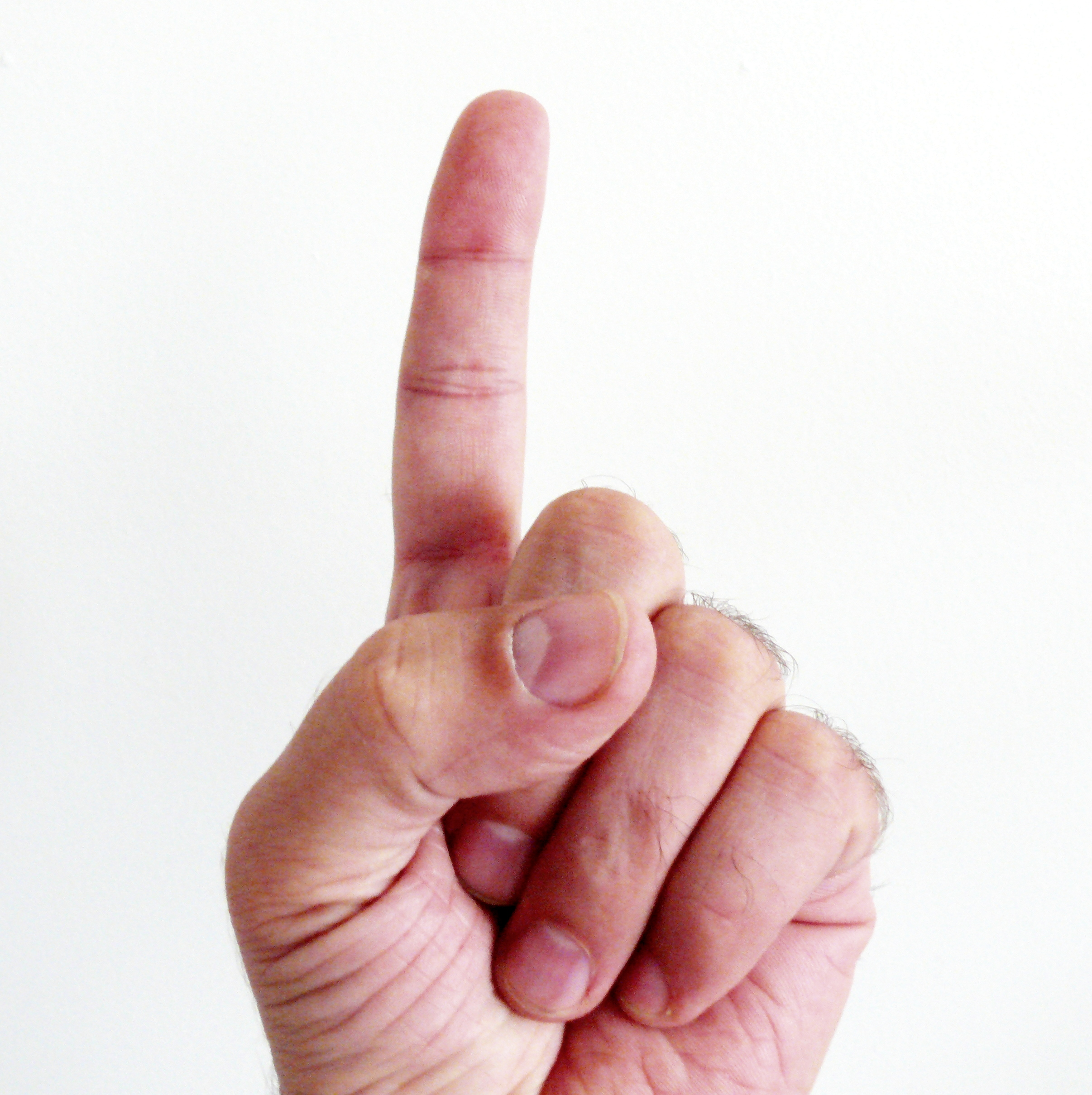
- Left human hand with index finger extended

Details
- Artery: Radial artery of index finger, proper palmar digital arteries, dorsal digital arteries
- Vein: Palmar digital veins, dorsal digital veins
- Nerve: Dorsal digital nerves of radial nerve, proper palmar digital nerves of median nerve

Identifiers
- Latin: digitus II manus, digitus secundus manus, index
- TA98: A01.1.00.054
- TA2: 152
- FMA: 24946

The index finger (also referred to as forefinger, first finger, second finger, pointer finger, trigger finger, digitus secundus, digitus II, and many other terms) is the second digit of a human hand. It is located between the thumb and the middle finger. It is usually the most dextrous and sensitive digit of the hand, though not the longest. It is shorter than the middle finger, and may be shorter or longer than the ring finger (see digit ratio).

== Anatomy ==
"Index finger" literally means "pointing finger", from the same Latin source as indicate; its anatomical names are "index finger" and "second digit".

The index finger has three phalanges. It does not contain any muscles, but is controlled by muscles in the hand by attachments of tendons to the bones.

== Uses ==
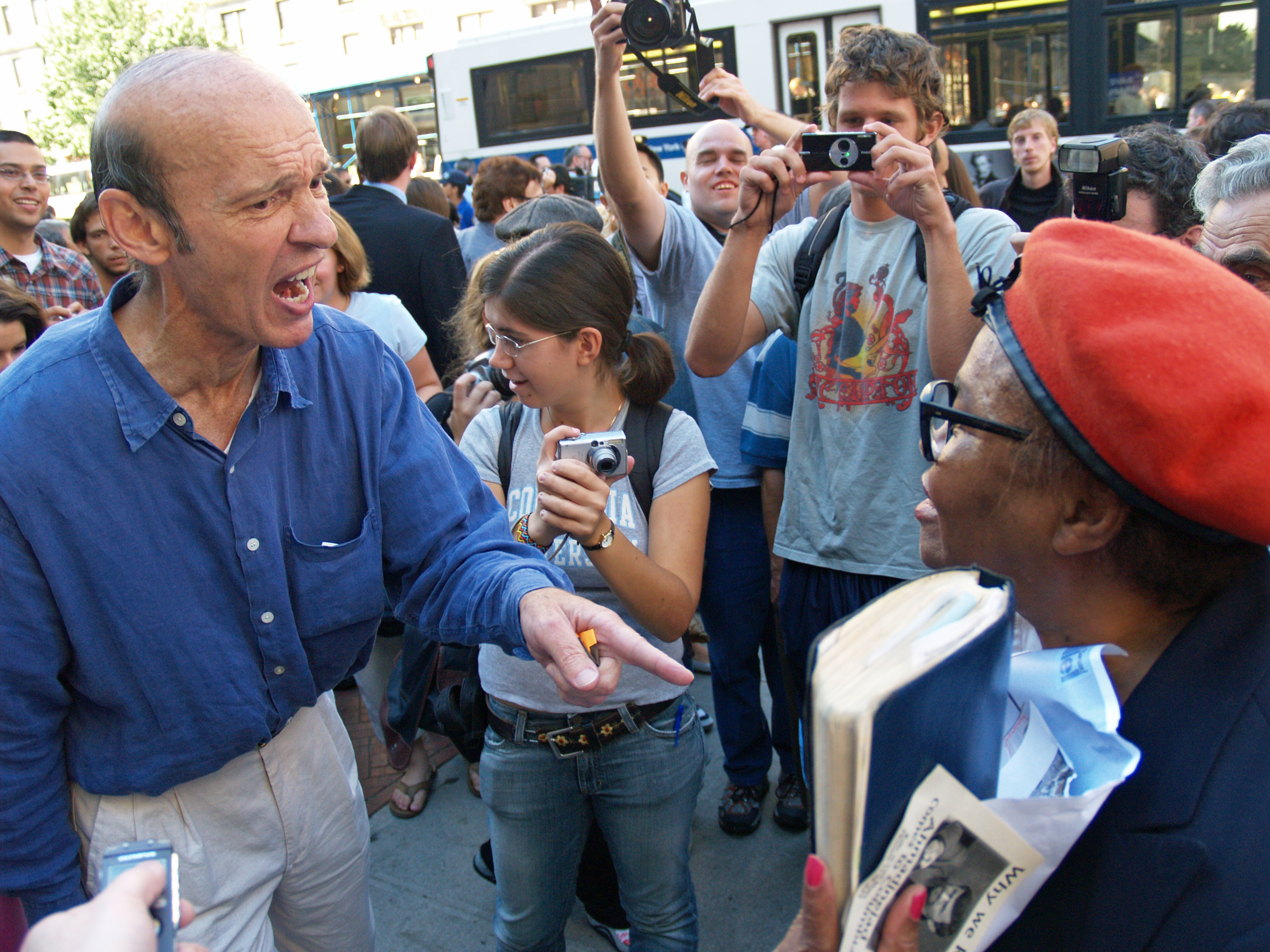
A man pointing at a woman during an argument

A lone index finger held vertically is often used to represent the number 1 (but finger counting differs across cultures), or when held up or moved side to side (finger-wagging), it can be an admonitory gesture. If held upward, it can also mean "wait a minute" or "one moment". With the hand held palm out and the thumb and middle fingers touching, it represents the letter d in the American Sign Language alphabet.

=== Pointing ===
Pointing with the pointer finger may be used to indicate or identify an item, person, place or object.

Around age one, babies begin pointing to communicate relatively complex thoughts, including interest, desire, and information. Pointing in human babies can demonstrate the theory of mind, or ability to understand what other people are thinking. This gesture may form one basis for the development of human language.

Non-human primates, lacking the ability to formulate ideas about what others are thinking, use pointing in much less complex ways. However, corvids, dogs and elephants do understand finger pointing.

In some cultures, particularly the Malays and Javanese in Southeast Asia, pointing using the index finger is considered rude, hence the thumb is used instead.

=== Index finger in Islam ===
In Islam raising the index finger signifies the Tawhīd (تَوْحِيد), which denotes the indivisible oneness of God. It is used to express the unity of God.

In Arabic, the index or fore finger is called musabbiḥa (مُسَبِّحة), mostly used with the definite article: al-musabbiḥa (الْمُسَبِّحة). Sometimes also as-sabbāḥa (السَّبّاحة) is used. The Arabic verb سَبَّحَ - which shares the same root as the Arabic word for index finger - means to praise or glorify God by saying: "Subḥāna Allāh" (سُبْحانَ الله).

== Gestures in art ==
The index finger pointing up is a sign of teaching authority. This is shown in the depiction of Plato in the School of Athens by Raphael.

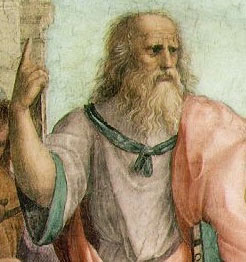
Plato, detail from the School of Athens, Raphael, 1509

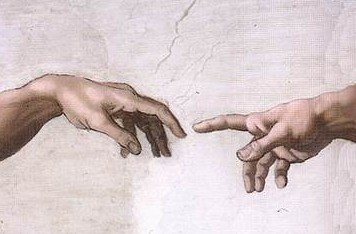
A detail from The Creation of Adam, Michelangelo, 1512

As a modern artistic convention, the index finger pointing at the viewer is in the form of a command or summons. Two famous examples of this are recruiting posters used during World War I by the United Kingdom and the United States.

Recruitment poster, Alfred Leete, 1914

Recruitment poster, James Montgomery Flagg, 1917

== See also ==
- Digit ratio, comparative lengths of the index finger and ring finger and androgen levels in utero
- Extensor indicis muscle
- Fingering (disambiguation)
- Finger numbering
- Index (typography)
- Pointing
