= Digitus V =

Digitus V or fifth digit can refer to:

- Little finger (digitus V manus)
- little toe (digitus V pedis)
