= Metacarpal arteries =

Metacarpal arteries can refer to:

- Palmar metacarpal arteries (arteriae metacarpales palmares, arteriae metacarpeae volares)
- Dorsal metacarpal arteries (arteriae metacarpales dorsales)
