= Intercapitular veins of the hand =

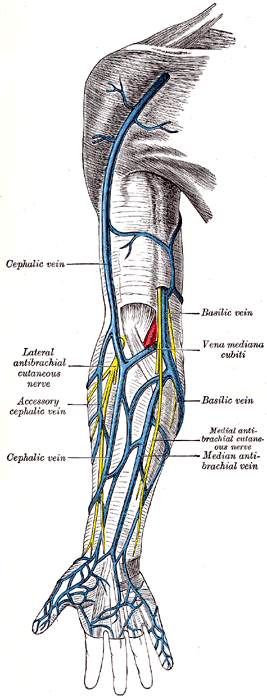
- The superficial veins of the upper extremity. (Intercapitular veins not labeled, but visible at bottom.)

Details
- Source: Palmar digital veins
- Drains to: Median antebrachial vein

Identifiers
- Latin: venae intercapitulares manus
- TA98: A12.3.08.024
- TA2: 4968
- FMA: 71583

The palmar digital veins on each finger are connected to the dorsal digital veins by oblique intercapitular veins. They drain into a venous plexus which is situated over the thenar and hypothenar eminences and across the front of the wrist.
