= Digitus III =

Digitus III or third digit can refer to:

- Middle finger (digitus III manus)
- Third toe (digitus III pedis)
