= Metacarpal veins =

metacarpal veins can refer to:

- Dorsal metacarpal veins (venae metacarpales dorsales)
- Palmar metacarpal veins (venae metacarpales palmares)
