= Digitus secundus =

Digitus secundus ('second digit') may refer to:

- Digitus secundus manus, the index finger
- Digitus secundus pedis, the second toe
