= Accessory vein =

Accessory vein may refer to:

- Accessory cephalic vein, a vein that passes along the radial border of the forearm
- Accessory hemiazygos vein, a vein on the left side of the vertebral column
- Accessory portal vein
- Anterior accessory saphenous vein, a special anterior tributary of the great saphenous vein
