= Digitus medius =

Digitus medius or middle digit can refer to:

- Middle finger (digitus medius manus)
- Third toe (digitus medius pedis)
