= Peter L. Hurd =

Canadian academic

- Education: Carleton University, Simon Fraser University, Stockholm University
- Known for: finger length and digit ratio, social behaviour esp. in conflict
- Scientific career
- Fields: biology, psychology
- Workplaces: University of Texas, University of Alberta

Peter L. Hurd is an academic specialising in biology. He is an associate professor at the University of Alberta within the Department of Psychology's Biocognition Unit and the University's Centre for Neuroscience. His research primarily focuses on the study of the evolution of aggressive behaviour, including investigation of aggression, communication and other social behaviour which takes place between animals with conflicting interests. Major tools for this research are mathematical modeling (principally game theory and genetic algorithms). He is also interested in how the process of sexual differentiation produces individual differences in social behaviour.

== Research ==
=== Evolution of animal signalling ===
Some of Hurd's most cited papers deal with the evolution of mating displays, including the idea that sexually selected traits have evolved to exploit previously existing biases in the sensory, or recognition, systems of their receivers, rather than being handicapped displays. Hurd has argued against the handicap principle view of animal communication, demonstrating the evolutionary stability of conventional (non-handicap) threat displays using game theoretical models. Adding empirical support to this theoretical work, Hurd has also argued that threat displays in birds and headbob displays in the lizard Anolis carolinensis are conventional signals, rather than handicaps. Hurd attributes the preponderance of handicap models in biology to the use of simple signalling games which are incapable of modelling conventional signalling.

=== Aggressiveness ===
Hurd has classified models of fighting behaviour into those driven by: 1) fighting ability (aka resource holding potential), 2) perceived value of winning, and 3) aggressiveness and argues that if variation in the last trait -aggressiveness- exists in a biologically meaningful way, it ought to be fixed for life at an early stage of development. Many studies on both human, and non-human, animals suggest that inter-individual variation in adult aggressiveness is largely organised by prenatal exposure to androgens. Digit ratio (2D:4D, the ratio of index to ring finger length) is a widely used as a proxy measure for prenatal testosterone exposure. Hurd demonstrated that men with more feminine typical-digit ratios showed lower aggressive tendency than males with more masculine-typical digit ratios.

=== Digit ratio ===
Hurd conducted a study on digit ratios suggesting a positive correlation in males between aggressive tendency and the ratio of the lengths of the ring finger to his index finger. These gathered significant media attention, being reported on the BBC, in The New York Times, Discover Magazine, Scientific American Mind, National Geographic and on Jay Leno. Hurd has demonstrated that, while there is no difference in digit ratio between the sexes in most laboratory mice, that pups which suggested next to brothers have higher digit ratios than those whose uterine neighbours were sisters, and that the large differences in digit ratios between populations may be explained by Allen's rule and Bergmann's rule.

== Academic history ==
Strongly influenced as a youth by the anarcho-punk movement and such influences as Jonathan Kozol and A. S. Neill's Summerhill School, Hurd was an enthusiastic member of a student run free school group while unenthusiastically attending Colonel By Secondary School. He then completed a BSc at Carleton University, Canada in 1990, followed by an MSc in 1993 from Simon Fraser University. He moved to Sweden to undertake a PhD at Stockholm University (Awarded in 1997) before committing to an initial postdoctoral fellowship with Mike Ryan at the University of Texas. Hurd then became a lecturer at the University of Texas in 2000 until 2001 when he moved to the University of Alberta, Canada as an assistant professor. Hurd was promoted to associate professor in 2007.

== See also ==
- Aggression
- Digit ratio
- Signalling theory
