= Digit ratio =

Ratio of lengths of fingers

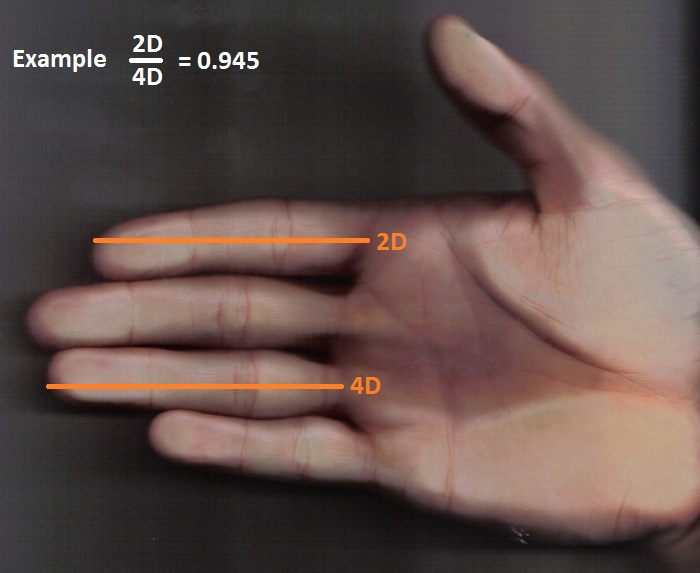
Hand with index finger shorter than the ring finger, resulting in a small 2D:4D ratio.

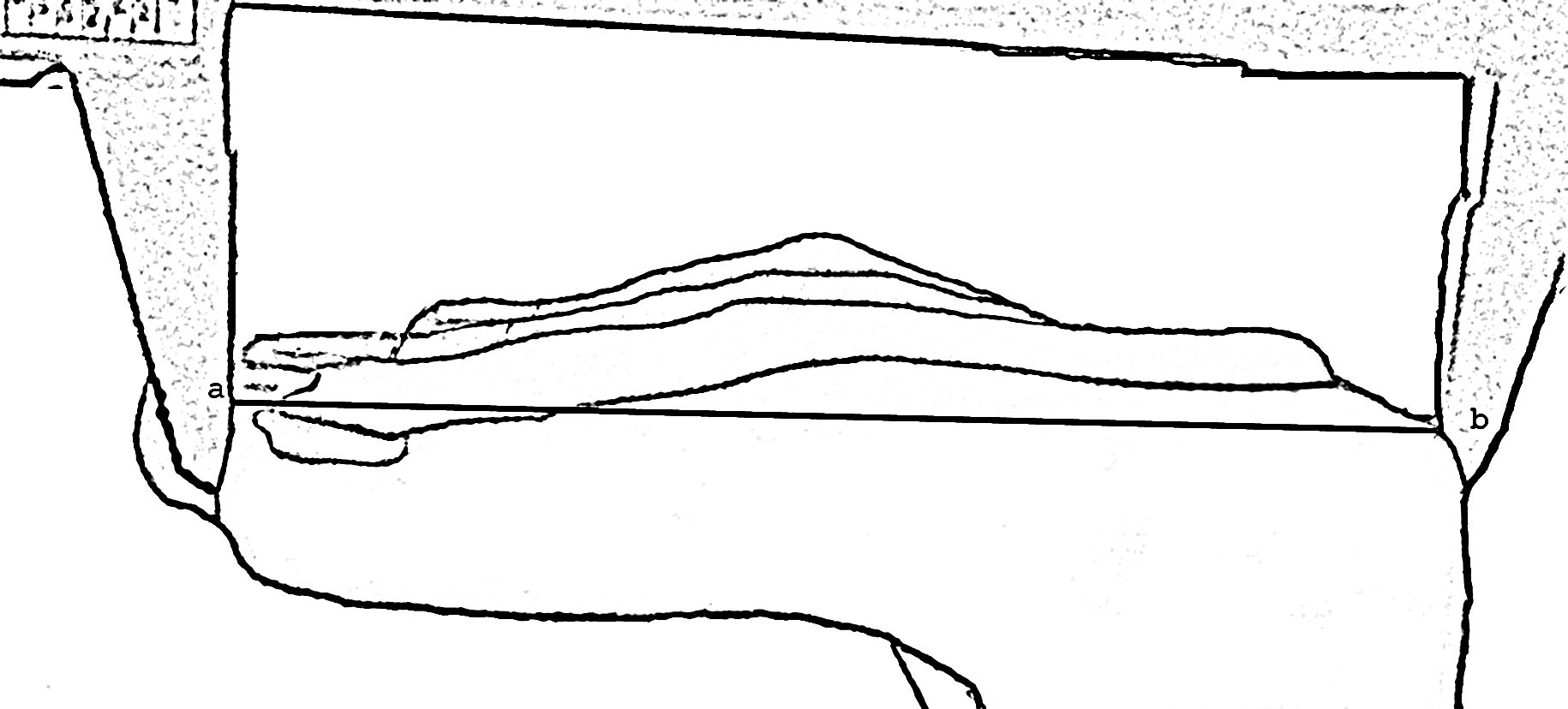
Image shows the measurement procedure of dorsal digit length using vernier calipers. The hand is placed on the edge of a table so that fingers are rested on table while making an angle of 90 degrees to the palm.

The digit ratio is the ratio taken of the lengths of different digits or fingers on a hand.

The most commonly studied digit ratio is that of the 2nd (index finger) and 4th (ring finger), also referred to as the 2D:4D ratio, measured on the palm side. It is proposed that the 2D:4D ratio indicates the degree to which an individual has been exposed to androgens during key stages of fetal development. A lower ratio (relatively shorter index finger) has been associated with higher androgen exposure, which would be the physiological norm for males but may also occur in some exceptional circumstances in females. The latter include developmental disorders such as congenital adrenal hyperplasia.

The 2D:4D ratio has been postulated to correlate with a range of physical and cognitive traits in childhood and adulthood, including personality traits such as assertiveness in women, aggressiveness in men, and cognitive abilities such as numerical skills. It has also been shown to vary considerably between racial groups with males having, on average, lower 2D:4D ratio than females.

Studies in this field have drawn criticism over questionable statistical significance and difficulties in reproducing their findings as well as lack of high quality research protocols.

== Measurement ==
The 2D:4D ratio is calculated by dividing the length of the index finger by the length of the ring finger of the same hand. Other digit ratios are also calculated similarly in the same hand.

The digit length is typically measured on the palmar (ventral, "palm-side") hand, from the midpoint of the bottom crease to the tip of the finger. Measurement of the digits on the dorsal ("back-side") hand, from the tip of the finger to the proximal phalange-bone protrusion (which occurs when digits are bent at 90 degrees to the palm) has also recently gained acceptance. A study has shown that, compared to the palmar digit ratio, the dorsal digit ratio is a better indicator of bone digit ratio. Furthermore, the palmar digit ratio is affected by the differential positioning of flexion creases.

It has been alleged that, because academics have accepted a variety of techniques and equipment (such as calipers, radiography and photocopy), researchers record multiple measurements and report only those which have significant findings, a form of reporting bias.

== History of research ==
Various reports in the scientific literature of the late 1800s noted that a greater proportion of men have shorter index fingers than ring fingers as compared to women. By 1930, statistically significant sex differences in digit ratio were established in a sample of 201 men and 109 women, after which time the sex difference appears to have been largely forgotten or ignored.

In 1983, Glenn Wilson of King's College London published a study examining the correlation between assertiveness in women and their digit ratio, which found that women with a lower 2D:4D ratio reported greater assertiveness. This was the first study to examine the correlation between digit ratio and a psychological trait within members of the same sex. Wilson proposed that skeletal structure and personality were simultaneously affected by sex hormone levels in utero.

In 1998, John T. Manning and colleagues reported the sex difference in digit ratios was present in two-year-old children and further developed the idea that the index was a marker of prenatal sex hormones. Since then, research on the topic has burgeoned around the world.

2D:4D digit ratios have been used alongside other methods in an attempt to understand Palaeolithic hand stencils found in prehistoric European and Indonesian cave painting.

== Sexual dimorphism and age ==
Studies measuring the 2D:4D of fetuses have found the ratio to be sexually dimorphic, being lower in males than females.

However, when examining the extent of sexual dimorphism evident after birth, adults were found to demonstrate more dimorphism than children, who show the same extent of dimorphism as fetuses. This has led the authors to suggest that digit ratio is also affected by postnatal development. Similarly, a study of people from Poland found statistically significant variation in 2D:4D between age groups (children, young adults and adults) for both males and females in the left hand, but only for women with the right hand.

Sexual dimorphism is strongest in digit ratios involving digit 2 with palmar measurements. However, when measured dorsally, digit ratios involving digit 5 showed strongest dimorphism, with women having shorter fifth digits on average. Overall, dorsal digit ratios demonstrate stronger sexual dimorphism than palmar digit ratios, including the palmar 2D:4D ratio that has been the basis of most study. Moreover, compared to palmar digit ratio, dorsal digit ratio is a better indicator of bone digit ratio. Thus, while most of the earlier research has focused on palmar 2D:4D ratio, study of other digit ratios is also promising.

A 2009 study in Biology Letters argues: "Sexual differences in 2D:4D are mainly caused by the shift along the common allometric line with non-zero intercept, which means 2D:4D necessarily decreases with increasing finger length, and the fact that men have longer fingers than women", which the authors claim may be the basis for the sex differences in 2D:4D and/or any putative hormonal influence on the ratios.

There has been no reliable correlation reported between 2D:4D and sex hormone levels in adulthood. Marta Kowal has suggested that testosterone levels are correlated with other factors (such as smoking, body weight and diet) that would impact the relationship between 2D:4D and an adult's testosterone level.

== Effect of prenatal hormones ==
It has been proposed that 2D:4D ratio is affected by fetal exposure to sex hormones, in particular to testosterone and other androgens. Lower 2D:4D is found to correlate with higher prenatal androgen exposure. Therefore digit ratio could be considered a proxy variable (indirect measure) for prenatal androgen exposure. Various studies suggest that 2D:4D is also influenced by prenatal estrogen exposure, and that it correlates negatively, not with prenatal testosterone alone, but with the testosterone-to-estrogen ratio.

Prenatal hormone exposure can be measured via amniocentesis (usually performed between 14th and 20th weeks of pregnancy), maternal serum sampling and umbilical cord sampling at birth, the latter being a measure of exposure in late gestation. A 2024 meta-analysis has suggested that digit ratio may be related to amniotic fluid testosterone levels, but not umbilical cord levels, requiring further validation.

A 2011 paper by Zhengui Zheng and Martin J. Cohn reports that "the 2D:4D ratio in mice is controlled by the balance of androgen to estrogen signaling during a narrow window of digit development". The formation of the digits in humans, in utero, is thought to occur by 13 weeks, and the bone-to-bone ratio is consistent from this point into an individual's adulthood. If, during this period, the fetus is exposed to androgens (levels of which are usually far higher in male than female fetuses) the growth rate of the 4th digit is increased. In a 2006 study, digit ratio analysis of opposite-sex dizygotic twins found that the females in these pairings were born with significantly lower 2D:4D ratio, postulated to occur from exposure to excess androgens from their brothers in utero (the hormone-transfer theory). However, an attempt to replicate these findings with a larger sample of dizygotic twins (867 individuals) found no differences in the variance or co-variance of same-sex and opposite-sex pairings to support the theory, though it did confirm female 2D:4D to be significantly higher than male as expected.

Researchers have raised concerns that, although the general trend points towards a correlation between digit ratio and early androgen exposure, many results have not been statistically significant.

Various findings have also challenged the general trend. One study of 66 children that attempted to replicate the findings of a frequently cited paper on the topic found no association between prenatal testosterone and estrogen levels and 2D:4D in childhood. Another paper also found no relationship between 2D:4D ratios and umbilical cord androgen and estrogen levels. A large meta-analysis studying genomic correlations was unable to find evidence for 2D:4D being a marker for prenatal androgen exposure, but did not exclude the possibility given constraints in genomic knowledge (with 3.8% of the variance in 2D:4D ratio accounted for genetically).

=== Developmental disorders ===
Women with congenital adrenal hyperplasia (CAH), who have elevated androgen levels before birth, have lower (more masculine) 2D:4D on average along with other possible physiological effects such as an enlarged clitoris and shallow vagina. Males with CAH also express lower digit ratios than controls. Amniocentesis samples in males with CAH show that prenatal levels of testosterone are in the high-normal range and levels of the weaker androgen androstenedione are several fold higher than in controls, indicating that males with CAH are exposed to greater prenatal concentrations of total androgens.

A greater (more feminine) digit ratio occurs for men with Klinefelter's syndrome, who have reduced testosterone secretion throughout life compared to their fathers or to controls.

Digit ratio in men may correlate with genetic variation in the androgen receptor gene. Men with genes that produce androgen receptors that are less sensitive to testosterone (because they have more CAG repeats) have greater digit ratios, though there have also been reports of failure in replicating this finding. Men with less sensitive androgen receptors may compensate for this by secreting more testosterone via reduced inhibitory feedback on gonadotropins. Thus, it is not clear that 2D:4D would be expected to correlate with CAG repeats, even if it accurately reflects prenatal androgen.

XY individuals with androgen insensitivity syndrome due to a dysfunctional gene for the androgen receptor present as women and have greater digit ratios on average, as would be predicted if androgenic hormones affect digit ratios. This finding suggests that the sex difference in digit ratios may be unrelated to the Y chromosome per se.

== Geographic and ethnic variation ==
Several studies have presented evidence that digit ratios are heritable.

Manning and colleagues have reported that 2D:4D ratios vary slightly between different ethnic groups. In a study of Han, Berber, Uygur and Jamaican children, Manning et al. found that Han children had the highest mean values of 2D:4D (0.954±0.032). They were followed by the Berbers (0.950±0.033), then the Uygurs (0.946±0.037) and the Jamaican children had the lowest mean 2D:4D (0.935±0.035). This variation is far larger than the differences between sexes; in Manning's words, "There's more difference between a Pole and a Finn, than a man and a woman."

In 2007, Manning et al. reported further evidence of ethnic variation in mean 2D:4D, with higher ratios for Whites, non-Chinese Asians and Middle-Easterners, and lower ratios in Chinese and Black samples. A 2008 study by Lu et al. found that the mean values of 2D:4D of the Hui and the Han in Ningxia were lower than those in European countries like Britain.

Two studies explored the question of whether geographical differences in 2D:4D ratios were caused by gene pool differences or whether some environmental variable associated with latitude might be involved (e.g., exposure to sunlight or different day-length patterns). The conclusions were that geographical differences in 2D:4D ratio were caused by genetic pool differences, not by geographical latitude.

Consanguineous parentage (inbreeding) has been found to lower the 2D:4D ratio in offspring, which may account for some of the geographical and ethnic variation in 2D:4D ratios, as consanguinity rates depend on, among others, religion, culture, and geography.

== Cognitive and physical traits ==
The 2D:4D ratio has been associated with a variety of traits including academic ability, personality as well as physical attributes such as health outcomes. Lower (masculinized) 2D:4D ratios have been associated with higher mathematical ability as well as personality traits such as aggressiveness (in males), assertiveness (in females) and reduced agreeableness. Males with higher (feminized) ratios are reported to be more at risk of low sperm counts, heart disease, obesity, metabolic syndrome and depression than those with lower ratios. Females with higher ratios are more at risk of eating disorders, anxiety and depression.

Prenatal androgen exposure has been implicated as a determinant in left-handedness, though contradictory and inconclusive findings have been reported concerning an association between 2D:4D and left-hand dominance. Kumar et al. have reported that hand preference is most strongly associated with 3D:4D digit ratios and that the effect is reversed between children and adults.

Fink et al. (2004) found that men with low 2D:4D ratios (indicating high testosterone) and women with high 2D:4D ratios (indicating high estrogen) express greater levels of facial symmetry. The prenatal sex hormone ratio (indicated by 2D:4D) was associated with similar alterations to both male and female face shapes in utero, though the effect was three times more pronounced in males than in females.

In a non-clinical sample of women, digit ratio correlated with anogenital distance in the expected direction. In other words, women with a greater anogenital distance, indicating greater prenatal androgen exposure, had a smaller digit ratio. Ronalds et al. (2002) showed that men who had an above average placental weight and a shorter neonatal crown-heel length had higher 2D:4D ratios in adult life.

In 2020, a paper by John T Manning and Bernhard Fink reported that at the national level, high mean male 2D:4D was associated with high case fatality rates with COVID-19, and suggested that this may be used to "identify for whom it would be advisable to exercise social distancing." Subsequent researchers failed to replicate their findings, and criticised Manning and Fink for publishing papers that fail under scrutiny despite the urgent need for high quality science during the pandemic that informs medical decisions.

=== Association with sexual orientation ===
2D:4D ratio is also correlated with sexual orientation. In a meta-analysis by Swift-Gallant et al. published in 2025, digit ratios were more masculine in lesbians and more feminine in gay men. Gay men had more feminine digit ratios on both the right and left hands, contrary to previous analyses, such as Grimbos et al. which had found "no association of 2D:4D with male sexual orientation". Although previous studies tended to group bisexual and homosexual individuals as "non-heterosexual", or left them out completely, the Swift-Gallant meta-analysis found that bisexual individuals were more similar to heterosexual individuals in their digit ratios. Several meta-analyses observe that the ethnicity of participants and/or the geographical location of studies seems to affect the association between 2D:4D ratio and sexual orientation. As the existing datasets include a large majority of Caucasian participants in high-income countries, the respective roles of ethnicity and geography have not yet been disentangled and identified.

== Explanation of the digit ratio effect ==
The mechanisms by which prenatal hormones influence digit ratio are not clearly understood. Traits such as otoacoustic emissions and arm-to-trunk length ratio are also influenced by prenatal hormones, and it is postulated that Hox genes responsible for both digit and penis development play an important role in affecting these multiple traits (pleiotropy). Direct effects of sex hormones on bone growth might be responsible, either by regulation of Hox genes in digit development or independently of such genes.

Though it is unclear why the digit ratio on the right hand should be more sensitive to prenatal hormones than that on the left hand, as indicated by the greater sex difference on the right than the left, these differences are not evident in dorsal measurements nor bone digit ratios, and it is possible that right-left differences in palmar 2D:4D may be attributed to differential placing of flexion creases.

== Criticism ==
The credibility of research into the relationship between digit ratios and traits has been subject to criticism for various reasons.

1. Weaknesses in the statistical significance of numerous findings.
2. Irreproducibility of findings in many instances, with some studies reporting contradictory results.
3. Lack of a clear cause-and-effect relationship between digit ratio and traits.

Concerning the evidence for causal relationships, the reliability of digit ratio as a proxy variable has come under scrutiny. Some studies that investigate the relationship between a trait and an unobservable variable fail to consider possible confounding variables. This is especially problematic in cases where the relationship is likely to be weak, such as with prenatal testosterone. Furthermore, critics have pointed out that controlling for confounding variables is an impossible task due to the expanding list of confounding variables, including ethnicity, sex, and physical, medical or behavioral conditions.

A 2021 paper by James Smoliga, titled "Giving science the finger—is the second-to-fourth digit ratio (2D:4D) a biomarker of good luck? A cross sectional study" followed similar research methodologies adopted by others in the field and came to conclude that low digit ratio is associated with good luck. This result is attributed to chance and presented as an illustration of the reproducibility crisis. Smoliga would later go on to label the field as pseudoscience. In a response, John T. Manning criticized the researchers for not controlling for ethnicity.

Researcher Marta Kowal states: "One of the general limitations of studies on the digit ratios is the high number of degrees of freedom within the 2D:4D (the right, left, and right minus left 2D:4D). Running many analyses with different predictors increases the chances of finding allegedly significant results."

== Other animals ==
- Dennis McFadden and collaborators have demonstrated sexual dimorphism in hind limb digit ratio in a number of great apes, including gorillas and chimpanzees.
- In various non-human primates, high 2D:4D ratios in females have been shown to corelate with monogamy and low 2D:4D ratios with polygyny and polygynandry.
- Emma Nelson and Susanne Shultz are currently investigating how 2D:4D relates to primate mating strategies and the evolution of human sociality.
- Nancy Burley's research group has demonstrated sexual dimorphism in zebra finches, and found a correlation between digit ratio in females and the strength of their preference for sexually selected traits in males.
- Alžbeta Talarovičová and collaborators found in rats that elevated testosterone during the prenatal period can influence 4D length, the 2D:4D ratio, and open field motor activity.
- Peter L. Hurd, Theodore Garland Jr., and their students have examined hindlimb 2D:4D in lines of mice selectively bred for high voluntary wheel-running behavior (see experimental evolution). These high-runner mice exhibit increased 2D:4D in contradiction to the correlation between digit ratio and physical fitness in human beings, suggesting that 2D:4D may not be a clear proxy for prenatal androgen exposure in mice. The authors suggest that 2D:4D may more accurately reflect the effect of glucocorticoids or other factors that regulate any of various genes.
- In pheasants, the ratio of the 2nd to 4th digit of the foot has been shown to be influenced by manipulations of testosterone in the egg.
- Studies in mice indicate that prenatal androgen influences 2D:4D primarily by promoting growth of the fourth digit.

== See also ==
- Anogenital distance
- Body mass index
- Chiromancy (palm reading)
- Dermatoglyphics
- Handedness and sexual orientation
- Waist–hip ratio
