= Accessory cephalic vein =

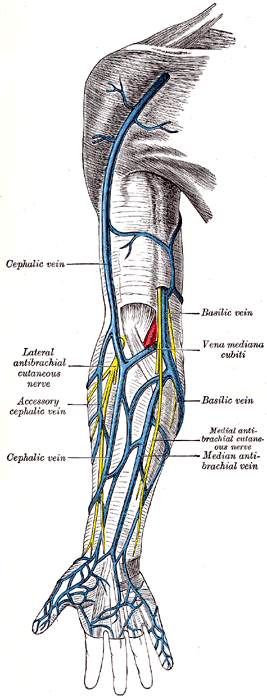
- Superficial veins of the upper limb (accessory cephalic vein labeled at center left)

Details
- Source: Dorsal venous network of hand
- Drains to: Cephalic vein

Identifiers
- Latin: vena cephalica accessoria
- TA98: A12.3.08.017
- TA2: 4966
- FMA: 22970

The accessory cephalic vein is a variable vein that passes along the radial border of the forearm to join the cephalic vein distal/inferior to the elbow. It may arise from a dorsal forearm venous plexus, or from the ulnar/medial side of the dorsal venous network of hand. In some cases the accessory cephalic springs from the cephalic above the wrist and joins it again higher up. A large oblique branch frequently connects the basilic and cephalic veins on the back of the forearm.

== See also ==
- Cephalic vein
