= Finger numbering =

Ambiguous numbering of the human fingers

The first finger is an ambiguous term in the English language due to two competing finger numbering systems that can be used. It might refer to either the thumb or the index finger, depending on the context. Consequently, also the terms second finger, third finger and fourth finger depend on the numbering system used in the context. Instead, the fifth finger will exclusively refer to the pinky, (also called the little finger), since the term is only used in the five-finger system.

== Finger numbering systems ==
The ordinal numbers of the fingers of the human hand are numbered ambiguously in the English language. This is due to two competing finger numbering systems that can be used. For instance, the first finger might refer to either the thumb or the index finger, depending on the context.

=== Five-finger system ===
In the five-finger system, the first finger refers to the thumb (or first digit); usually this system is used in a medical context, or in a musical context when referring to playing keyboard instruments, such as the piano or accordion.

Consequently, second finger under this system will refer to the index finger (or second digit), third finger refers to the middle finger (or third digit), fourth finger refers to the ring finger (or fourth digit) and fifth finger refers to the little finger (or fifth digit).

=== Four-finger system ===
Here, in the four-finger system, as well as in common English, the first finger refers to the index finger (the finger next to the thumb). This designation carries over in a musical context when referencing the playing of stringed instruments (such as the guitar), woodwind instruments (such as flutes, pipes, or piccolos), and brass instruments (such as horns).

Consequently, second finger under this system will refer to the middle finger, third finger refers to the ring finger, fourth finger refers to the pinky (or little) finger.

== See also ==
- Finger
- Hand
