= Little finger =

Smallest finger of the human hand

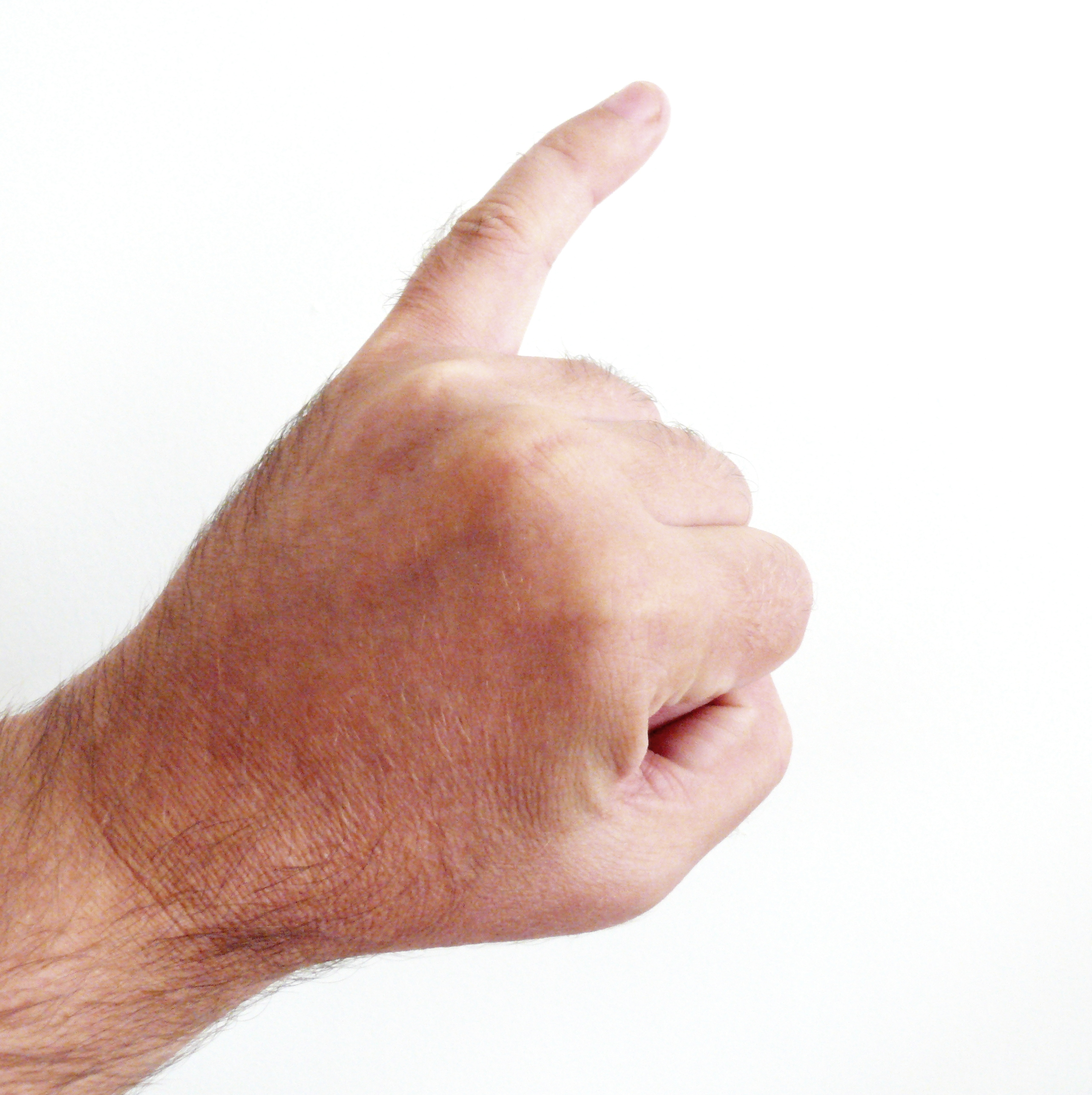
- Human little finger

Details
- Artery: Proper palmar digital arteries, dorsal digital arteries
- Vein: Palmar digital veins, dorsal digital veins
- Nerve: Dorsal digital nerves of ulnar nerve
- Lymph: Supratrochlear

Identifiers
- Latin: digitus minimus manus, digitus quintus manus, digitus V manus
- TA98: A01.1.00.057
- TA2: 155
- FMA: 24949

The little finger or pinkie/pinky, also known as the baby finger, or fifth digit is the most ulnar and smallest digit of the human hand, and next to the ring finger.

== Etymology of "pinky" ==
The word "pinky" is derived from the Dutch word pink, meaning "little finger".

The earliest recorded use of the term "pinkie" is from Scotland in 1808. The term (sometimes spelled "pinky") is common in Scottish English and American English, and is also used extensively in other Commonwealth countries such as New Zealand, Canada, and Australia.

== Nerves and muscles ==
There are nine muscles that control the fifth digit: Three in the hypothenar eminence, two extrinsic flexors, two extrinsic extensors, and two more intrinsic muscles:

- Hypothenar eminence:
  - Opponens digiti minimi muscle
  - Abductor minimi digiti muscle (adduction from third palmar interossei)
  - Flexor digiti minimi brevis (the "longus" is absent in most humans)
- Two extrinsic flexors:
  - Flexor digitorum superficialis
  - Flexor digitorum profundus
- Two extrinsic extensors:
  - Extensor digiti minimi muscle
  - Extensor digitorum
- Two intrinsic hand muscles:
  - Fourth lumbrical muscle
  - Third palmar interosseous muscle

Note: the dorsal interossei of the hand muscles do not have an attachment to the fifth digit

== Cultural significance ==
=== Gestures ===
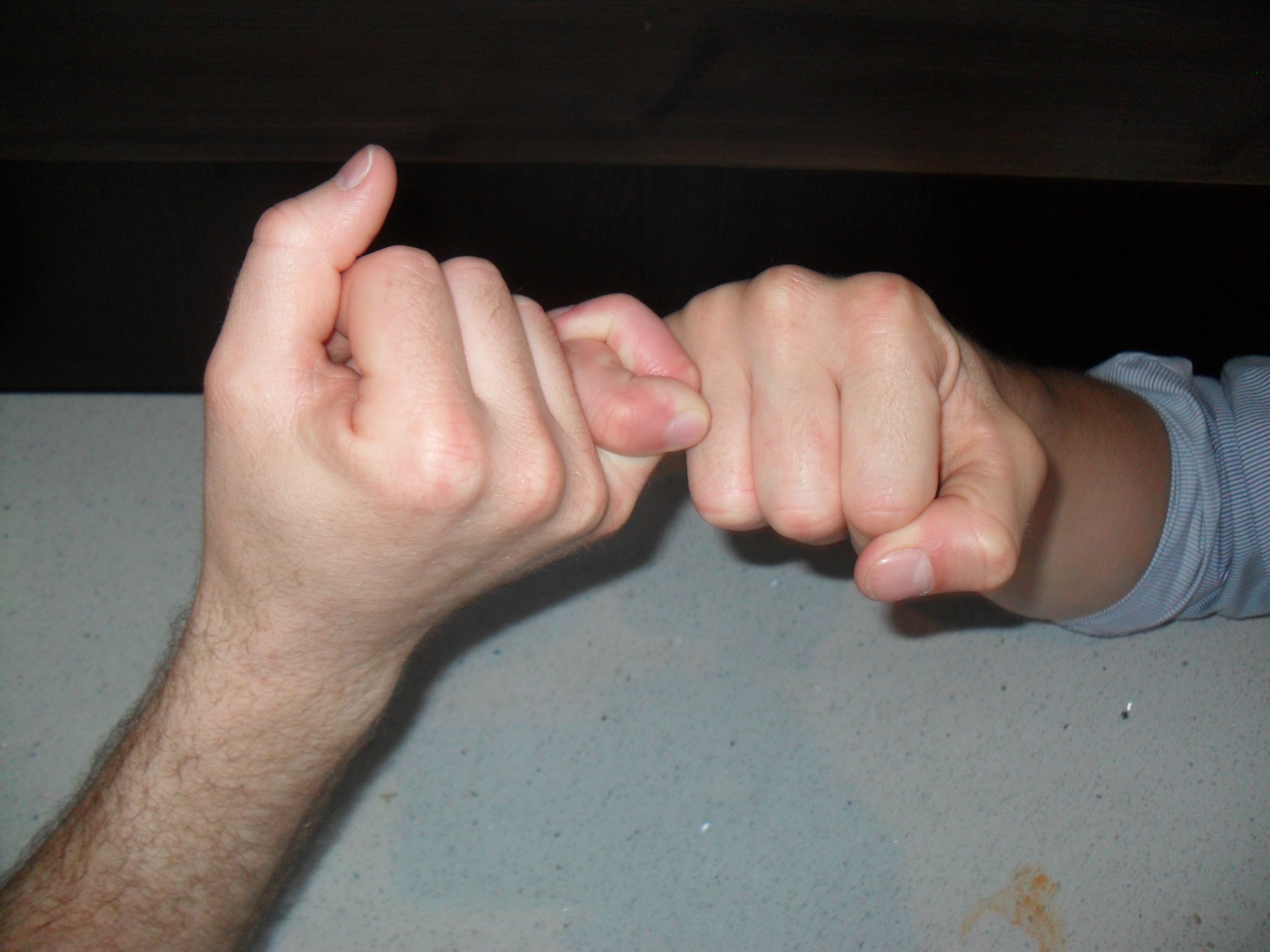
Pinky promise

Among American children, a "pinky swear" or "pinky promise" is made when a person wraps one of their pinky fingers around another person's pinky and makes a promise. Something similar is also seen in China and Korea, where people link their pinky fingers and then stamp their thumbs together to make a yaksok (promise).

Other gestures where the little finger is extended include the shaka sign and sign of the horns.

Among members of the Japanese yakuza (gangsters), the penalty for various offenses is removal of parts of the little finger (known as yubitsume).

It is a common joke that one should extend their little finger when drinking from a teacup in imitation of a passé upper-class tradition. This practice is generally deprecated by etiquette guides as a sign of snobbery amongst the socially inferior, with various cultural theories as to the origin of the practice, including the idea that finger food should be eaten with only the first three digits.

=== Rings ===
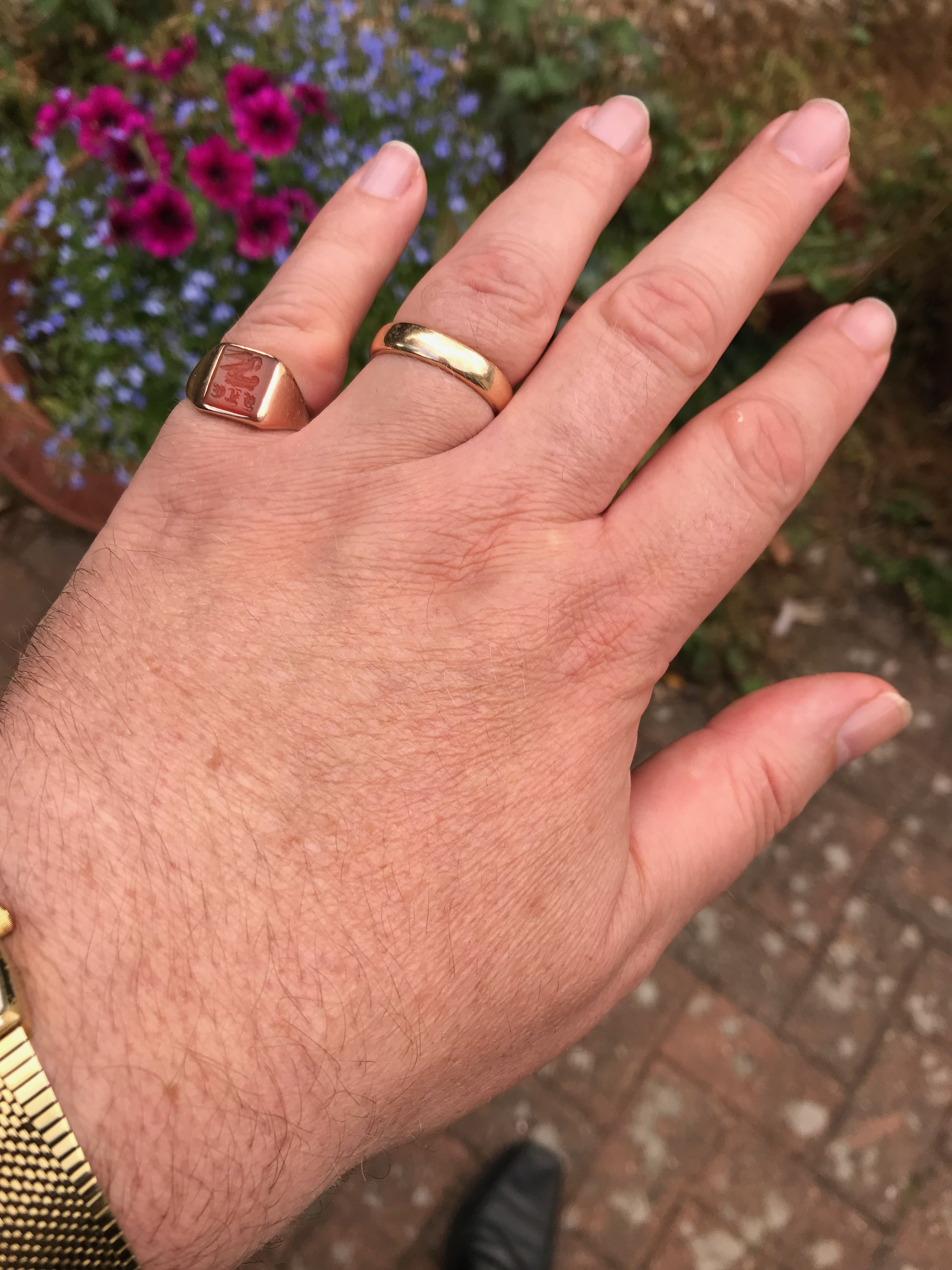
Signet ring (little finger) and wedding ring (ring finger) on a left hand

The signet ring is traditionally worn on the little finger of a gentleman's left hand, a practice still common especially in the United Kingdom, Australia, and European cultures. A signet ring is considered part of the regalia of many European monarchies, and also of the Pope, with the ring always worn on the left little finger. In modern times the location of the signet ring has relaxed, with examples worn on various different digits, although little fingers still tend to be the most usual.

The Iron Ring is a symbolic ring worn by most Canadian engineers. The Ring is a symbol of both pride and humility for the engineering profession, and is always worn on the little finger of the dominant hand. In the United States, the Engineer's Ring is a stainless steel ring worn on the fifth digit of the working hand by engineers who belong to the Order of the Engineer and have accepted the Obligation of an Engineer.

=== Utility ===
The little finger is often used as a support when smartphone users type one-handed. The little finger is positioned underneath the phone, allowing it to be propped with the three middle fingers, and the user to type with their thumb.

Some users reported dents on their little finger and pain in the hand after prolonged use in this way, doctors referred to this as "iPhone pinky" or "smartphone pinky". The skin indentations were reported to be nothing of alarm, as they disappeared on their own after a short while without cell phone use.

== See also ==
- Finger numbering
- Fifth metacarpal bone, the bone in the hand proximal to the little finger
- Pinky ring, a ring worn on the little finger
- Red string of fate, a Chinese belief that soulmates are bound by a string attached to the little finger
