= Dorsal metacarpal veins =

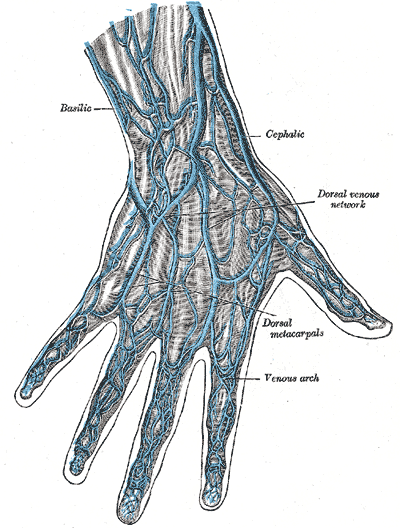
- The veins on the dorsum of the hand.

Details
- Source: Dorsal digital veins
- Drains to: Dorsal venous network of hand
- Artery: Dorsal metacarpal arteries

Identifiers
- Latin: venae metacarpales dorsales
- TA98: A12.3.08.025
- TA2: 4969
- FMA: 70940

The dorsal digital veins from the adjacent sides of the fingers unite to form three dorsal metacarpal veins, which end in a dorsal venous net-work opposite the middle of the metacarpus.

They are a popular site for peripheral venous cannulation because they tend to be prominent veins which are easily accessible and do not lie over a point of flexion - so are not too uncomfortable for the patient.
