= Proper palmar digital nerves of median nerve =

Nerve

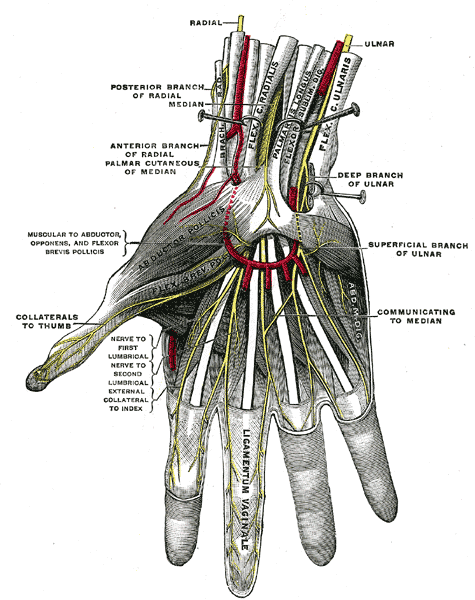
- Superficial palmar nerves.

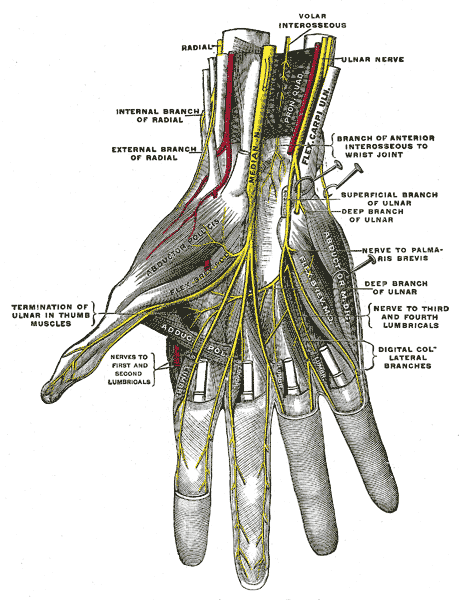
- Deep palmar nerves.

Details
- From: Common palmar digital nerves of median nerve

Identifiers
- Latin: nervi digitales palmares proprii nervi mediani
- TA98: A14.2.03.039
- TA2: 6466

In the palm of the hand the median nerve is covered by the skin and the palmar aponeurosis, and rests on the tendons of the flexor muscles. Immediately after emerging from under the transverse carpal ligament the median nerve becomes enlarged and flattened and splits into a smaller, lateral, and a larger, medial portion.

The lateral portion supplies a short, stout branch to certain of the muscles of the ball of the thumb, viz., the abductor pollicis brevis, the opponens pollicis, and the superficial head of the flexor brevis, and then divides into three proper palmar digital nerves of median nerve (proper volar digital nerves):

- two of these supply the sides of the thumb,
- while the third gives a twig to the first lumbricalis and is distributed to the radial side of the index finger.

It also divides into two common palmar digital nerves:

- The first of these divides into two proper digital nerves for the adjoining sides of the index and middle fingers;
- the second common palmar digital nerve splits into two proper digital nerves for the adjoining sides of the third and fourth digits.

Each proper digital nerve, opposite the base of the first phalanx, gives off a dorsal branch which joins the dorsal digital nerve from the superficial branch of the radial nerve, and supplies the integument on the dorsal aspect of the last phalanx.

At the end of the digit, the proper digital nerve divides into two branches,

- one of which supplies the pulp of the finger,
- the other ramifies around and beneath the nail.

The proper digital nerves, as they run along the fingers, are placed superficial to the corresponding arteries.

== See also ==
- Common palmar digital nerves of median nerve

== Additional images ==
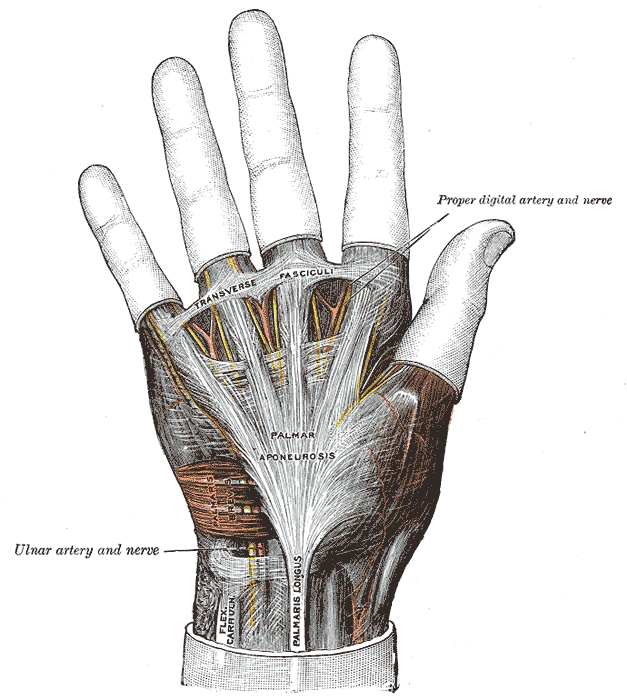
The palmar aponeurosis.

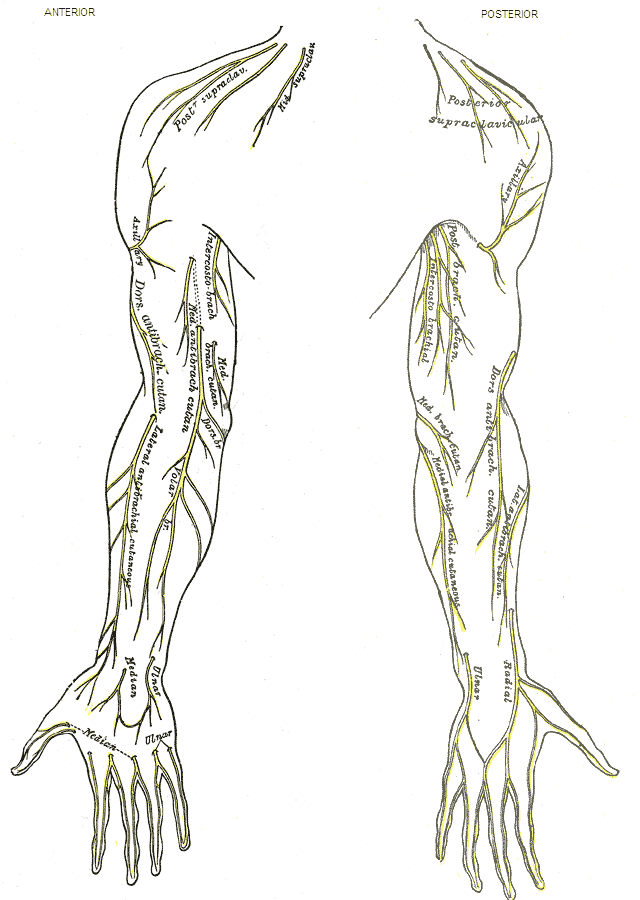
Cutaneous nerves of right upper extremity.

Diagram of segmental distribution of the cutaneous nerves of the right upper extremity.

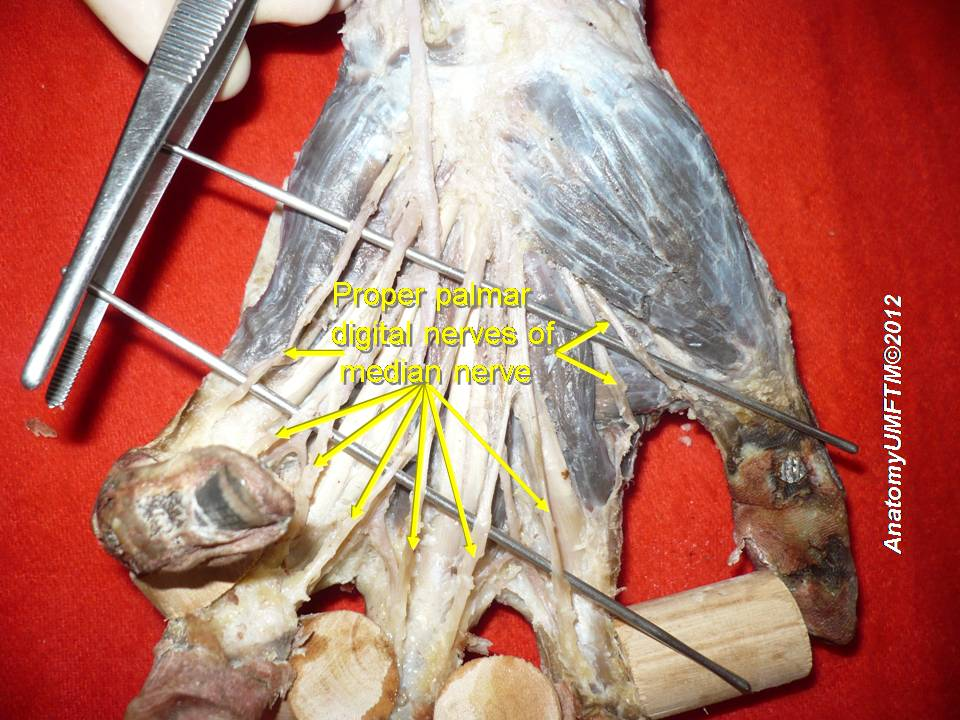
Proper palmar digital nerves of median nerve
