= Proper palmar digital arteries =

- Palm of left hand, showing position of skin creases and bones, and surface markings for the volar arches. Only the proximal origin parts of the proper palmar digital arteries are shown.

Details
- Source: Common palmar digital arteries
- Vein: Palmar digital veins
- Supplies: Fingers

Identifiers
- Latin: arteriae digitales palmares propriae, arteriae digitales volares propriae
- TA98: A12.2.09.058
- TA2: 4673
- FMA: 70804

The proper palmar digital arteries travel along the sides of the phalanges (along the contiguous sides of the index, middle, ring, and little fingers), each artery lying just below (dorsal to) its corresponding digital nerve.

Alternative names for these arteries are: proper volar digital arteries, (Note: Palmar and volar may be used synonymously, but volar is less common.) collateral digital arteries, (Note: Thus called because they run alongside (collateral to) the finger bones.) arteriae digitales palmares propriae, (Note: This is the official and international Latin term as defined by the Terminologia Anatomica (TA), but in English speaking countries and especially the US, proper palmar digital arteries is more commonly used.) or aa. digitales volares propriae. (Note: Again, palmar and volar may be used synonymously, but aa. digitales volares propriae does not occur in the TA, and can therefore be considered deprecated.)

Proper palmar digital arteries anastomose freely in the subcutaneous tissue of the finger tips and by smaller branches near the interphalangeal joints. Dorsal branches supplied by the arteries anastomose with the dorsal digital arteries, and supply the soft parts on the back of the second and third phalanges, including the matrix of the fingernail.

The proper palmar digital artery for the medial side of the little finger arises directly from the ulnar artery deep to the palmaris brevis muscle, but the rest arise from the common palmar digital arteries.

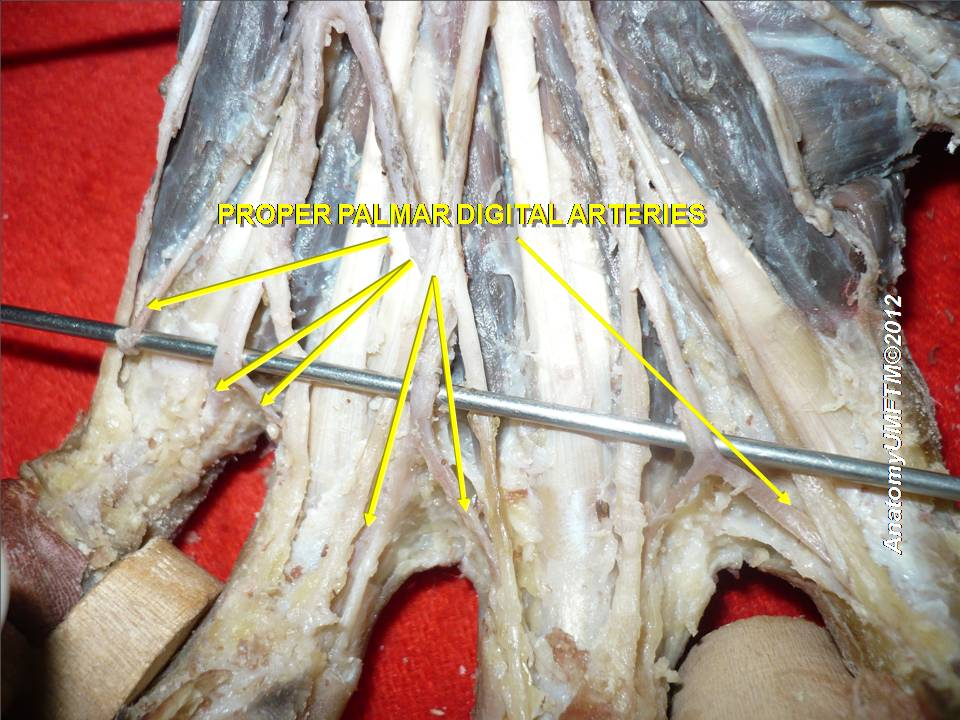
Proper palmar digital arteries

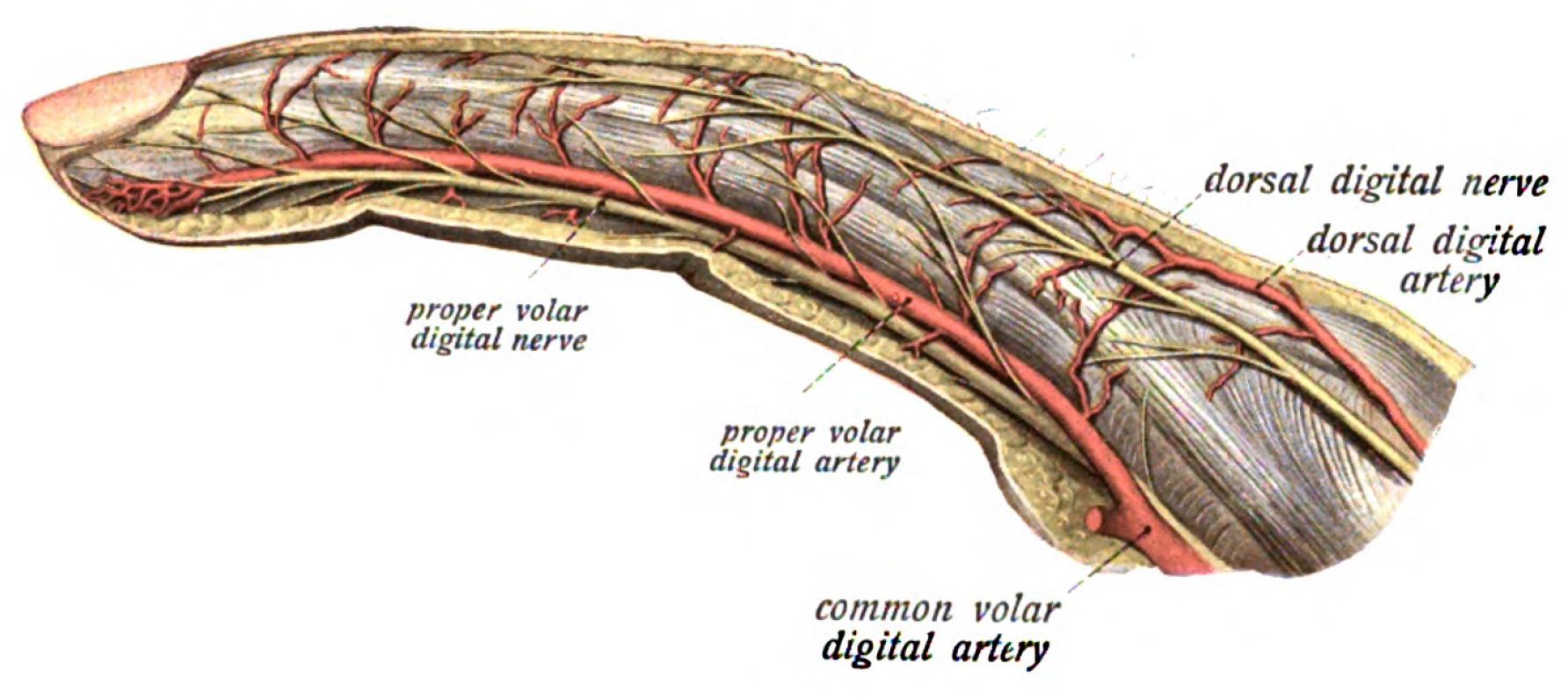
Lateral aspect of finger, with artery labeled a proper volar digital artery.

== See also ==
- Superficial palmar arch
- Proper palmar digital nerves of median nerve
