= Middle finger =

Third finger of the human hand

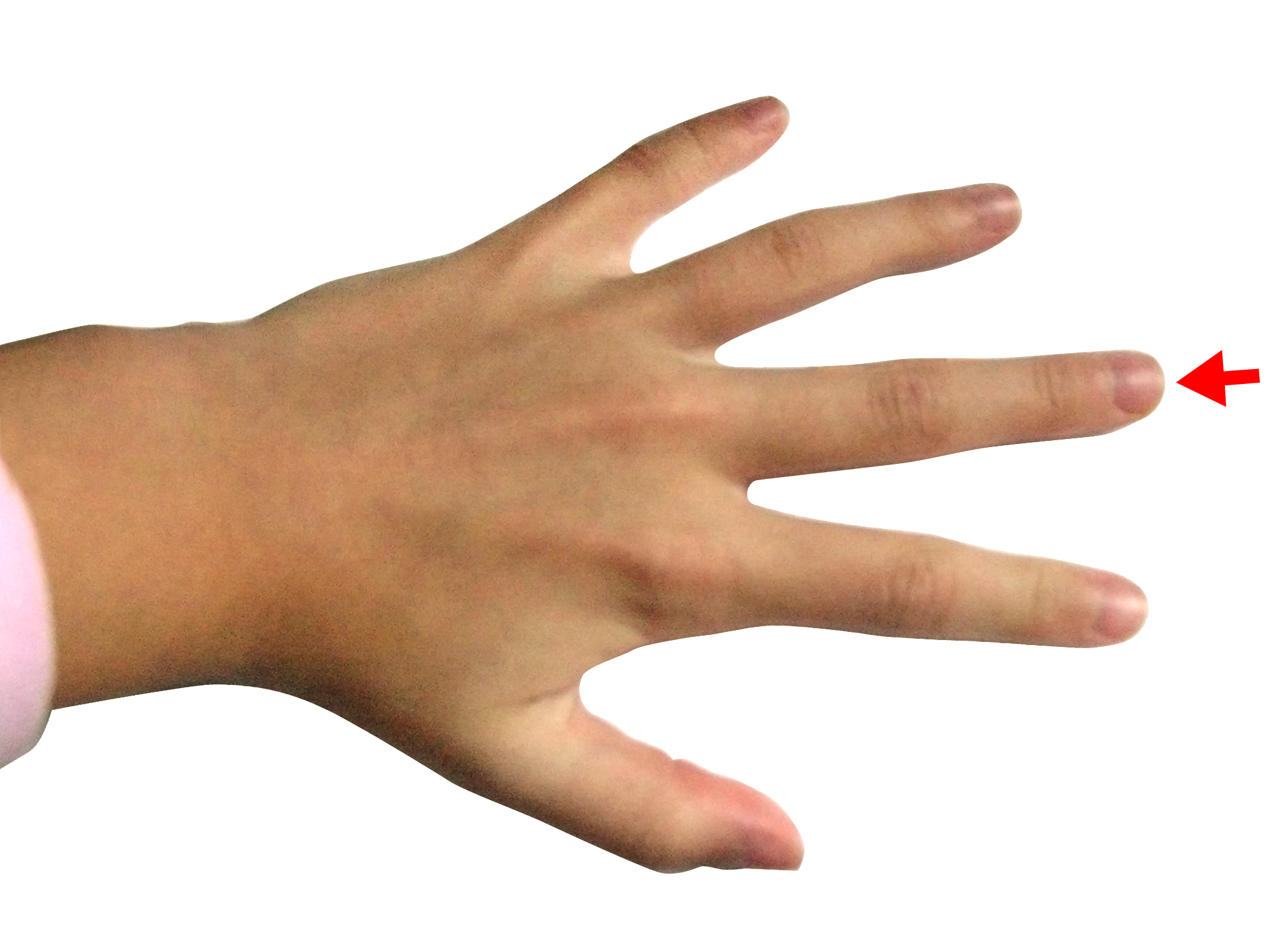
- Middle finger of the left hand

Details
- Artery: Proper palmar digital arteries, dorsal digital arteries
- Vein: Palmar digital veins, dorsal digital veins
- Nerve: Dorsal digital nerves of radial nerve, proper palmar digital nerves of median nerve

Identifiers
- Latin: digitus III manus, digitus medius manus, digitus tertius manus
- TA98: A01.1.00.055
- TA2: 153
- FMA: 24947

The middle finger, long finger, second finger, third finger, tall finger or tall man is the third digit of the human hand, typically located between the index finger and the ring finger. It is typically the longest digit. In anatomy, it is also called the third finger, digitus medius, digitus tertius or digitus III.

== Overview ==
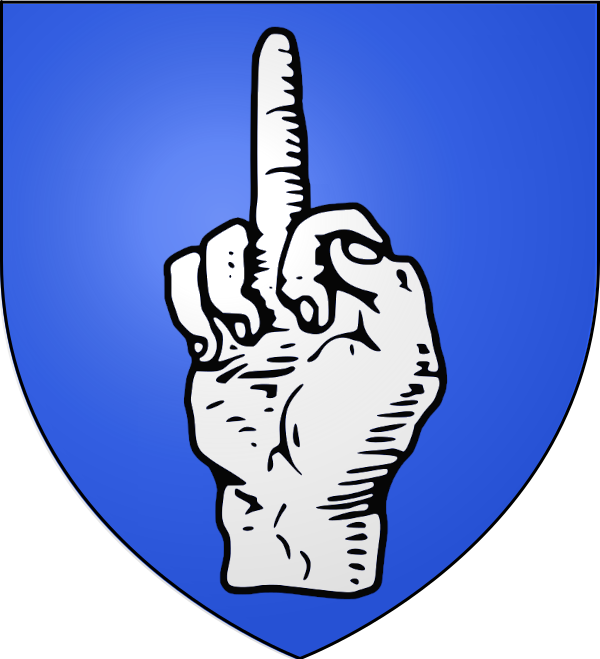
A medieval coat of arms with an extended middle finger

In Western countries, extending the middle finger (either by itself, or along with the index finger in the United Kingdom: see V sign) is an offensive and obscene gesture, widely recognized as a form of insult, due to its resemblance of an erect penis. It is known, colloquially, as "flipping the bird", "flipping (someone) off", or "giving (someone) the finger".

The middle finger is often used for finger snapping together with the thumb.

== See also ==
- Finger numbering
- Galileo's middle finger
