= Dorsal metacarpal arteries =

Arteries of the back of the forearm and hand

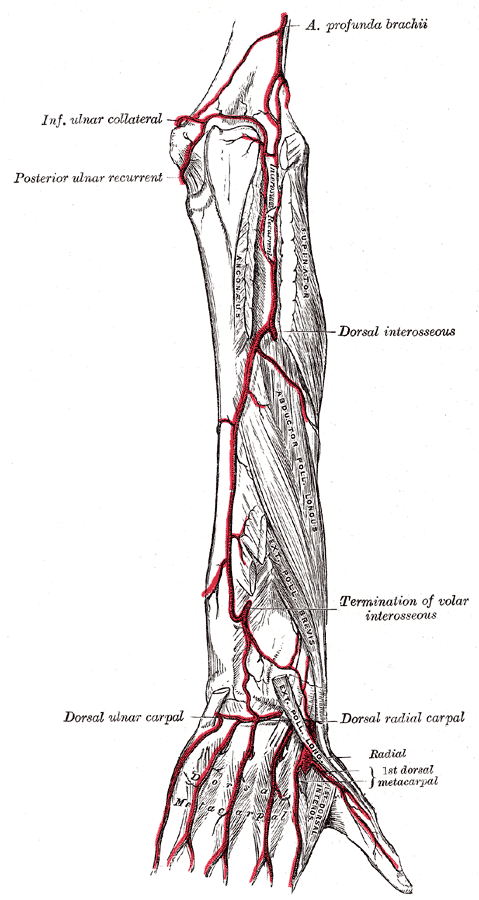
- Arteries of the back of the forearm and hand. (Dorsal metacarpal visible at bottom center.)

Details
- Source: Dorsal carpal arch
- Branches: Dorsal digital arteries
- Vein: Dorsal metacarpal veins

Identifiers
- Latin: arteriae metacarpales dorsales
- TA98: A12.2.09.034
- TA2: 4648
- FMA: 70800

Most of the dorsal metacarpal arteries arise from the dorsal carpal arch and run downward on the second, third, and fourth dorsal interossei of the hand and bifurcate into the dorsal digital arteries. Near their origin, they anastomose with the deep palmar arch by perforating arteries. They also anastomose with common palmar digital arteries (from the superficial palmar arch), also via perforating arteries.

The first dorsal metacarpal artery arises directly from the radial artery before it crosses through the two heads of the first dorsal interosseous muscle.
