= Dorsal digital nerves of ulnar nerve =

- Diagram of segmental distribution of the cutaneous nerves of the right upper extremity.

Details
- From: Dorsal branch of ulnar nerve

Identifiers
- Latin: nervi digitales dorsales nervi ulnaris
- TA98: A14.2.03.043
- TA2: 6452

Dorsal digital nerves of ulnar nerve are branches on the dorsum of the hand. The dorsal branch of the ulnar nerve divides into two dorsal digital branches; one supplies the ulnar side of the little finger; the other, the adjacent sides of the little and ring fingers. It also sends a twig to join that given by the superficial branch of the radial nerve for the adjoining sides of the middle and ring fingers, and assists in supplying them.

They run with the dorsal digital arteries.
