= Dorsal digital arteries of hand =

Dorsal digital arteries

Details
- Source: Dorsal metacarpal arteries
- Vein: Dorsal digital veins

Identifiers
- Latin: arteriae digitales dorsales manus
- TA98: A12.2.09.035
- TA2: 4649

Dorsal digital arteries arise from the bifurcation of dorsal metacarpal arteries. They travel along the sides and dorsal aspects of the phalanges of the middle finger, ring finger, and little finger. They communicate with the proper palmar digital arteries.

They run with the dorsal digital nerves of ulnar nerve and dorsal digital nerves of radial nerve.

== See also ==
- Dorsal digital arteries of foot
