= Dorsal digital arteries of foot =

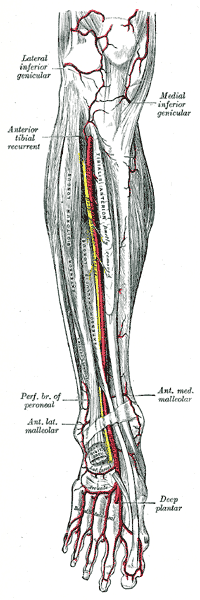
- Anterior tibial and dorsalis pedis arteries. (Dorsal digital arteries of foot not labeled, but visible at bottom.)

Details
- Source: Dorsal metatarsal arteries

Identifiers
- Latin: arteriae digitales dorsales pedis
- TA98: A12.2.16.053
- TA2: 4719
- FMA: 70801

The dorsal digital arteries of foot are small arteries which supply the toes.

== See also ==
- Dorsal digital arteries of hand
