= Palmar digital veins =

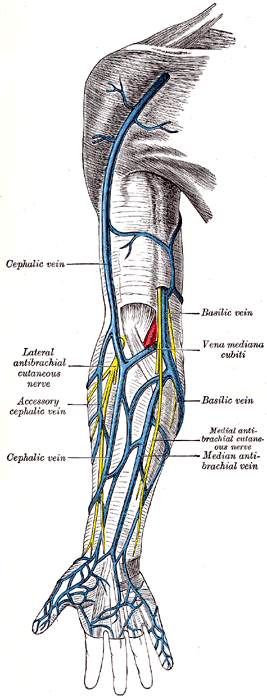
- The superficial veins of the upper extremity. (Palmar digital veins not labeled but visible at bottom.)

- Palm of left hand, showing position of skin creases and bones, and surface markings for the volar arches. (Palmar digital veins not visible, but diagram shows location of corresponding arteries.)

Details
- Drains to: Intercapitular veins, superficial palmar venous arch
- Artery: Common palmar digital arteries, proper palmar digital arteries

Identifiers
- Latin: venae digitales palmares
- TA98: A12.3.08.027
- TA2: 4987
- FMA: 70895

The palmar digital veins (or volar digital veins) on each finger are connected to the dorsal digital veins by oblique intercapitular veins.

Some sources distinguish between the "proper palmar digital veins", which are more distal, and the "common palmar digital veins", which are more proximal.
