= Dorsal digital nerves of radial nerve =

- Diagram of segmental distribution of the cutaneous nerves of the right upper extremity. (Dorsal digital nerves of radial nerve at bottom right, in yellow.)

Details
- From: Radial nerve

Identifiers
- Latin: nervi digitales dorsales nervi radialis
- TA98: A14.2.03.058
- TA2: 6439
- FMA: 75490

Dorsal digital nerves of radial nerve are branches on the dorsum of the hand.

They run with the dorsal digital arteries.
