= Dorsal venous network of hand =

Veins on the back of the hand

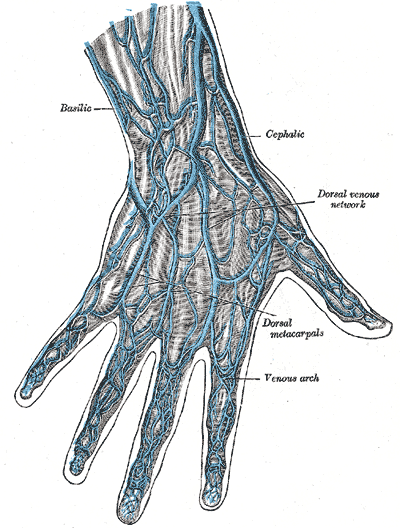
- The veins on the dorsum of the hand. (Dorsal venous network labeled at center right.)

Details
- Drains from: Hand
- Source: Dorsal metacarpal veins
- Drains to: Cephalic vein, basilic vein

Identifiers
- Latin: rete venosum dorsale manus
- TA98: A12.3.08.023
- TA2: 4967
- FMA: 67977

The dorsal venous network of the hand is a venous network on the dorsum (backside) of hand. It is formed by the dorsal metacarpal veins (three in number), a dorsal digital vein from the radial (lateral) side of the index finger and one from the ulnar (medial) side of the little finger, and both dorsal digital veins of the thumb. The venous network gives rise to the cephalic vein and the basilic vein; an accessory cephalic vein may arise from it as well.
