= Glossary of medicine =

This glossary of medicine includes definitions of medical terminology and other terms pertaining to medicine and related fields.

== A ==
- Aarskog–Scott syndrome – (AAS) A rare, inherited (X-linked) disease characterized by short stature, facial abnormalities, skeletal and genital anomalies.
- Abdomen – The part of the body between the chest and pelvis, which contains most of the tubelike organs of the digestive tract, as well as several solid organs.
- Abdominal external oblique muscle – The largest, and outermost, of the three flat muscles of the lateral anterior abdominal wall
- Abdominal guarding – The tensing of muscles of the abdominal wall to shield inflamed or injured organs of the abdominal cavity from pain caused by the application of pressure.
- Abdominal internal oblique muscle – A muscle of the abdominal wall, which lies below the external oblique and just above the transverse abdominal muscles.
- Abductor pollicis brevis muscle – A muscle in the hand that abducts (straightens) the thumb.
- Abductor pollicis longus muscle – One of the extrinsic muscles of the hand. Its major function is to abduct the thumb at the wrist.
- Abscess – A collection of pus that has built up within the tissue of the body.
- Accommodation – the process by which the eye focuses on an object.
- Accommodation reflex – a reflex action of the eye, measured as a response to focusing on a near object, then looking at a distant object (and vice versa).
- Acetabulum – a concave surface of the pelvis, which forms the pelvic section of the hip joint.
- Achilles tendon – a tendon of the back of the leg, and the thickest in the human body. It attaches the plantaris, gastrocnemius (calf) and soleus muscles to the calcaneus (heel) bone.
- Acne – a long-term skin disease that occurs when hair follicles are clogged with dead skin cells and oil from the skin.
- Acne vulgaris – see Acne
- Acupressure – an alternative medicine technique where pressure is applied to acupuncture points. Pressure may be applied by hand, by elbow, or with various devices.
- Acupuncture – a form of alternative medicine in which thin needles are inserted into the body.
- Adam's apple – the lump or protrusion that is formed by the angle of the thyroid cartilage surrounding the larynx seen especially in males.
- Adaptive immune system – also known as the acquired immune system or, more rarely, as the specific immune system, is a subsystem of the overall immune system that is composed of highly specialized, systemic cells and processes that eliminate pathogens or prevent their growth.
- Adenoma – (plural adenomas or adenomata) is a benign tumor of epithelial tissue with glandular origin, glandular characteristics, or both.
- Adrenal gland – The adrenal glands (also known as suprarenal glands) are endocrine glands that produce a variety of hormones including adrenaline and the steroids aldosterone and cortisol. They are found above the kidneys.
- Allergy – Allergies, also known as allergic diseases, are a number of conditions caused by hypersensitivity of the immune system to typically harmless substances in the environment. These diseases include hay fever, food allergies, atopic dermatitis, allergic asthma, and anaphylaxis. Symptoms may include red eyes, an itchy rash, sneezing, a runny nose, shortness of breath, or swelling. Food intolerances and food poisoning are separate conditions.
- ADHD – Attention deficit hyperactivity disorder.
- Alzheimer's disease – (AD), also referred to simply as Alzheimer's, is a chronic neurodegenerative disease that usually starts slowly and worsens over time. It is the cause of 60–70% of cases of dementia. The most common early symptom is difficulty in remembering recent events (short-term memory loss).
- Anal canal – is the terminal part of the large intestine. It is situated between the rectum and anus, below the level of the pelvic diaphragm. In humans it is approximately 2.5 to 4 cm (0.98-1.58 in) long. It lies in the anal triangle of perineum in between the right and left ischioanal fossa.
- Anatomy – is the branch of biology concerned with the study of the structure of organisms and their parts. Anatomy is a branch of natural science which deals with the structural organization of living things.
- Anesthesiology – Anesthesiology, anaesthesiology, anaesthesia or anaesthetics (see Terminology) is the medical speciality concerned with the total perioperative care of patients before, during and after surgery.
- Angiology – is the medical specialty which studies the diseases of the circulatory system and of the lymphatic system, i.e., arteries, veins and lymphatic vessels, and its diseases.
- Ankle – The ankle, or the talocrural region, is the region where the foot and the leg meet. The ankle includes three joints: the ankle joint proper or talocrural joint, the subtalar joint, and the inferior tibiofibular joint. The movements produced at this joint are dorsiflexion and plantarflexion of the foot. In common usage, the term ankle refers exclusively to the ankle region. In medical terminology, "ankle" (without qualifiers) can refer broadly to the region or specifically to the talocrural joint.
- Anterior tibial artery – The anterior tibial artery of the leg carries blood to the anterior compartment of the leg and dorsal surface of the foot, from the popliteal artery.
- Antibiotic – is a type of antimicrobial substance active against bacteria and is the most important type of antibacterial agent for fighting bacterial infections. Antibiotic medications are widely used in the treatment and prevention of such infections.
- Antibody – (Ab), also known as an immunoglobulin (Ig), is a large, Y-shaped protein produced mainly by plasma cells that is used by the immune system to neutralize pathogens such as pathogenic bacteria and viruses.
- Aorta – is the main artery in the human body, originating from the left ventricle of the heart and extending down to the abdomen, where it splits into two smaller arteries (the common iliac arteries). The aorta distributes oxygenated blood to all parts of the body through the systemic circulation.
- Appendix – The appendix (or vermiform appendix; also cecal [or caecal] appendix; vermix; or vermiform process) is a finger-like, blind-ended tube connected to the cecum, from which it develops in the embryo. The cecum is a pouch-like structure of the colon, located at the junction of the small and the large intestines. The term "vermiform" comes from Latin and means "worm-shaped." The appendix used to be considered a vestigial organ, but this view has changed over the past decades.
- Arm – is the part of the upper limb between the glenohumeral joint (shoulder joint) and the elbow joint. In common usage, the arm extends to the hand. It can be divided into the upper arm, which extends from the shoulder to the elbow, the forearm which extends from the elbow to the hand, and the hand. Anatomically the shoulder girdle with bones and corresponding muscles is by definition a part of the arm. The Latin term brachium may refer to either the arm as a whole or to the upper arm on its own.
- Arteriole – is a small-diameter blood vessel in the microcirculation that extends and branches out from an artery and leads to capillaries. Arterioles have muscular walls (usually only one to two layers of smooth muscle) and are the primary site of vascular resistance. The greatest change in blood pressure and velocity of blood flow occurs at the transition of arterioles to capillaries.
- Artery – is a blood vessel that takes blood away from the heart to all parts of the body (tissues, lungs, etc.). Most arteries carry oxygenated blood; the two exceptions are the pulmonary and the umbilical arteries, which carry deoxygenated blood to the organs that oxygenate it. The effective arterial blood volume is that extracellular fluid which fills the arterial system.
- Arthritis – is a term often used to mean any disorder that affects joints. Symptoms generally include joint pain and stiffness. Other symptoms may include redness, warmth, swelling, and decreased range of motion of the affected joints.
- Asperger syndrome – (AS), also known as Asperger's, is a developmental disorder characterized by significant difficulties in social interaction and nonverbal communication, along with restricted and repetitive patterns of behavior and interests. As a milder autism spectrum disorder (ASD), it differs from other ASDs by relatively normal language and intelligence. Although not required for diagnosis, physical clumsiness and unusual use of language are common.
- Asthma – is a common long-term inflammatory disease of the airways of the lungs. It is characterized by variable and recurring symptoms, reversible airflow obstruction, and bronchospasm. Symptoms include episodes of wheezing, coughing, chest tightness, and shortness of breath.
- Atony – absence of muscle tone.
- Atrial fibrillation – (AF or A-fib) is an abnormal heart rhythm characterized by rapid and irregular beating of the atria. Often it starts as brief periods of abnormal beating which become longer and possibly constant over time. Often episodes have no symptoms.
- Attention deficit hyperactivity disorder – is a mental disorder of the neurodevelopmental type. It is characterized by problems paying attention, excessive activity, or difficulty controlling behavior which is not appropriate for a person's age.
- Auscultation – is listening to the internal sounds of the body, usually using a stethoscope. Auscultation is performed for the purposes of examining the circulatory and respiratory systems (heart and breath sounds), as well as the gastrointestinal system.
- Autism – is a developmental disorder characterized by troubles with social interaction and communication, and by restricted and repetitive behavior. Parents usually notice signs during the first two or three years of their child's life. These signs often develop gradually, though some children with autism reach their developmental milestones at a normal pace before worsening.
- Axilla – (also, armpit, underarm or oxter) is the area on the human body directly under the joint where the arm connects to the shoulder. It also provides the under-arm sweat gland.
- Axillary artery – is a large blood vessel that conveys oxygenated blood to the lateral aspect of the thorax, the axilla (armpit) and the upper limb. Its origin is at the lateral margin of the first rib, before which it is called the subclavian artery.

== B ==
- Back – The human back is the large posterior area of the human body, rising from the top of the buttocks to the back of the neck and the shoulders. It is the surface of the body opposite from the chest. The vertebral column runs the length of the back and creates a central area of recession. The breadth of the back is created by the shoulders at the top and the pelvis at the bottom.
- Back pain – is pain felt in the back. It is divided into neck pain (cervical), middle back pain (thoracic), lower back pain (lumbar) or coccydynia (tailbone or sacral pain) based on the segment affected. The lumbar area is the most common area for pain, as it supports most of the weight in the upper body. Episodes of back pain may be acute, sub-acute, or chronic depending on the duration. The pain may be characterized as a dull ache, shooting or piercing pain, or a burning sensation. Discomfort can radiate into the arms and hands as well as the legs or feet, and may include numbness, or weakness in the legs and arms.
- Barotrauma – is injury caused by a pressure difference between tissues and a gas filled space.
- Basal
  - Anatomy: In the direction of the base. Antonym apical.
  - Physiology: Lowest sustained level or minimum level required, as in basal metabolic rate.
- Beta cell – Beta cells (β cells) are a type of cell found in pancreatic islets that synthesize and secrete insulin. Beta cells make up 50-70% of the cells in human islets. In patients with type I or type II diabetes, beta-cell mass and function are diminished, leading to insufficient insulin secretion and hyperglycemia.
- Biceps – also biceps brachii (Latin for "two-headed muscle of the arm"), is a large muscle that lies on the front of the upper arm between the shoulder and the elbow. Both heads of the muscle arise on the scapula and join to form a single muscle belly which is attached to the upper forearm. While the biceps crosses both the shoulder and elbow joints, its main function is at the elbow where it flexes the forearm and supinates the forearm. Both these movements are used when opening a bottle with a corkscrew: first biceps unscrews the cork (supination), then it pulls the cork out (flexion).
- Biceps brachii – The biceps, also biceps brachii (Latin for "two-headed muscle of the arm"), is a large muscle that lies on the front of the upper arm between the shoulder and the elbow. Both heads of the muscle arise on the scapula and join to form a single muscle belly which is attached to the upper forearm. While the biceps crosses both the shoulder and elbow joints, its main function is at the elbow where it flexes the forearm and supinates the forearm. Both these movements are used when opening a bottle with a corkscrew: first biceps unscrews the cork (supination), then it pulls the cork out (flexion).
- Bile duct – is any of a number of long tube-like structures that carry bile. Bile, required for the digestion of food, is secreted by the liver into passages that carry bile toward the hepatic duct, which joins with the cystic duct (carrying bile to and from the gallbladder) to form the common bile duct, which opens into the intestine.
- Biliary tract – The biliary tract, (biliary tree or biliary system) refers to the liver, gall bladder and bile ducts, and how they work together to make, store and secrete bile. Bile consists of water, electrolytes, bile acids, cholesterol, phospholipids and conjugated bilirubin. Some components are synthesised by hepatocytes (liver cells), the rest are extracted from the blood by the liver.
- Binge eating disorder – (BED), is an eating disorder characterized by frequent and recurrent binge eating episodes with associated negative psychological and social problems, but without subsequent purging episodes (e.g. vomiting). BED is a recently described condition, which was required to distinguish binge eating similar to that seen in bulimia nervosa but without characteristic purging. Individuals who are diagnosed with bulimia nervosa and binge eating disorder exhibit similar patterns of compulsive overeating, neurobiological features of dysfunctional cognitive control and food addiction, and biological and environmental risk factors. Indeed, some consider BED a milder version of bulimia, and that the conditions are on the same spectrum.
- Biological engineering – or bioengineering, or bio-engineering, is the application of principles of biology and the tools of engineering to create usable, tangible, economically viable products. Biological engineering employs knowledge and expertise from a number of pure and applied sciences, such as mass and heat transfer, kinetics, biocatalysts, biomechanics, bioinformatics, separation and purification processes, bioreactor design, surface science, fluid mechanics, thermodynamics, and polymer science. It is used in the design of medical devices, diagnostic equipment, biocompatible materials, renewable bioenergy, ecological engineering, agricultural engineering, and other areas that improve the living standards of societies.
- Biology – is the natural science that studies life and living organisms, including their physical structure, chemical processes, molecular interactions, physiological mechanisms, development and evolution.
- Biochemistry – sometimes called biological chemistry, is the study of chemical processes within and relating to living organisms.
- Bioinformatics – is an interdisciplinary field that develops methods and software tools for understanding biological data. As an interdisciplinary field of science, bioinformatics combines biology, computer science, information engineering, mathematics and statistics to analyze and interpret biological data.
- Biopsy – is a medical test commonly performed by a surgeon, interventional radiologist, or an interventional cardiologist involving extraction of sample cells or tissues for examination to determine the presence or extent of a disease.
- Biostatistics – are the application of statistics to a wide range of topics in biology. It encompasses the design of biological experiments, especially in medicine, pharmacy, agriculture and fishery; the collection, summarization, and analysis of data from those experiments; and the interpretation of, and inference from, the results. A major branch is medical biostatistics, which is exclusively concerned with medicine and health.
- Bipolar disorder – is a mental disorder that causes periods of depression and periods of abnormally elevated mood
- Birth control – also known as contraception and fertility control, is a method or device used to prevent pregnancy.
- Bladder cancer – is any of several types of cancer arising from the tissues of the urinary bladder. It is a disease in which cells grow abnormally and have the potential to spread to other parts of the body. Symptoms include blood in the urine, pain with urination, and low back pain.
- Blood pressure – is the pressure of circulating blood on the walls of blood vessels. Used without further specification, "blood pressure" usually refers to the pressure in large arteries of the systemic circulation. Blood pressure is usually expressed in terms of the systolic pressure (maximum during one heartbeat) over diastolic pressure (minimum in between two heartbeats) and is measured in millimeters of mercury (mmHg), above the surrounding atmospheric pressure.
- Blood vessel – The blood vessels are the part of the circulatory system, and microcirculation, that transports blood throughout the human body.
- Bone – is a rigid organ that constitutes part of the vertebrate skeleton. Bones support and protect the various organs of the body, produce red and white blood cells, store minerals, provide structure and support for the body, and enable mobility. Bones come in a variety of shapes and sizes and have a complex internal and external structure. They are lightweight yet strong and hard, and serve multiple functions.
- Bone marrow – is a semi-solid tissue which may be found within the spongy or cancellous portions of bones. Bone marrow is the primary site of new blood cell production or hematopoiesis. It is composed of hematopoietic cells, marrow adipose tissue, and supportive stromal cells. In adult humans, bone marrow is primarily located in the ribs, vertebrae, sternum, and bones of the pelvis. On average, bone marrow constitutes 4% of the total body mass of humans; in an adult having 65 kilograms of mass (143 lb), bone marrow typically accounts for approximately 2.6 kilograms (5.7 lb).
- Brachial artery – is the major blood vessel of the (upper) arm. It is the continuation of the axillary artery beyond the lower margin of teres major muscle. It continues down the ventral surface of the arm until it reaches the cubital fossa at the elbow. It then divides into the radial and ulnar arteries which run down the forearm. In some individuals, the bifurcation occurs much earlier and the ulnar and radial arteries extend through the upper arm. The pulse of the brachial artery is palpable on the anterior aspect of the elbow, medial to the tendon of the biceps, and, with the use of a stethoscope and sphygmomanometer (blood pressure cuff) often used to measure the blood pressure.
- Brachial plexus – is a network of nerves formed by the ventral rami of the lower four cervical nerves and first thoracic nerve (C5, C6, C7, C8, and T1). This plexus extends from the spinal cord, through the cervicoaxillary canal in the neck, over the first rib, and into the armpit. It supplies afferent and efferent nerve fibers to the chest, shoulder, arm and hand.
- Brachial veins – In human anatomy, the brachial veins are venae comitantes of the brachial artery in the arm proper. Because they are deep to muscle, they are considered deep veins. Their course is that of the brachial artery (in reverse): they begin where radial veins and ulnar veins join (corresponding to the bifurcation of the brachial artery). They end at the inferior border of the teres major muscle. At this point, the brachial veins join the basilic vein to form the axillary vein. The brachial veins also have small tributaries that drain the muscles of the upper arm, such as biceps brachii muscle and triceps brachii muscle.
- Brachioradialis – is a muscle of the forearm that flexes the forearm at the elbow. It is also capable of both pronation and supination, depending on the position of the forearm. It is attached to the distal styloid process of the radius by way of the brachioradialis tendon, and to the lateral supracondylar ridge of the humerus.
- Bradycardia –is a condition typically defined wherein an individual has a resting heart rate of under 60 beats per minute (BPM) in adults.
- Brain – The human brain is the central organ of the human nervous system, and with the spinal cord makes up the central nervous system. The brain consists of the cerebrum, the brainstem and the cerebellum. It controls most of the activities of the body, processing, integrating, and coordinating the information it receives from the sense organs, and making decisions as to the instructions sent to the rest of the body. The brain is contained in, and protected by, the skull bones of the head.
- Brain tumor – occurs when abnormal cells form within the brain. There are two main types of tumors: malignant or cancerous tumors and benign tumors.
- Brain metastasis – is a cancer that has metastasized (spread) to the brain from another location in the body and is therefore considered a secondary brain tumor. The metastasis typically shares a cancer cell type with the original site of the cancer.
- Breast – The breast is one of two prominences located on the upper ventral region of the torso of primates. In females, it serves as the mammary gland, which produces and secretes milk to feed infants. Both females and males develop breasts from the same embryological tissues. At puberty, estrogens, in conjunction with growth hormone, cause breast development in female humans and to a much lesser extent in other primates. Breast development in other primate females generally only occurs with pregnancy.
- Breast cancer – is cancer that develops from breast tissue. Signs of breast cancer may include a lump in the breast, a change in breast shape, dimpling of the skin, fluid coming from the nipple, a newly inverted nipple, or a red or scaly patch of skin. In those with distant spread of the disease, there may be bone pain, swollen lymph nodes, shortness of breath, or yellow skin.
- Broca's area – or the Broca area, is a region in the frontal lobe of the dominant hemisphere, usually the left, of the brain with functions linked to speech production.
- Bronchiole – The bronchioles or bronchioli are the passageways by which air passes through the nose or mouth to the alveoli (air sacs) of the lungs, in which branches no longer contain cartilage or glands in their submucosa. They are branches of the bronchi, and are part of the conducting zone of the respiratory system. The bronchioles divide further into smaller terminal bronchioles which are still in the conducting zone and these then divide into the smaller respiratory bronchioles which mark the beginning of the respiratory region.
- Bronchus – A bronchi is a passage of airway in the respiratory system that conducts air into the lungs. The first bronchi to branch from the trachea are the right main bronchus and the left main bronchus. These are the widest and enter the lungs at each hilum, where they branch into narrower secondary bronchi known as lobar bronchi, and these branch into narrower tertiary bronchi known as segmental bronchi. Further divisions of the segmental bronchi are known as 4th order, 5th order, and 6th order segmental bronchi, or grouped together as subsegmental bronchi. The bronchi when too narrow to be supported by cartilage are known as bronchioles. No gas exchange takes place in the bronchi.
- Bruit – also called vascular murmur, is the abnormal sound generated by turbulent flow of blood in an artery due to either an area of partial obstruction or a localized high rate of blood flow through an unobstructed artery.
- Bulimia nervosa – also known as simply bulimia, is an eating disorder characterized by binge eating followed by purging. Binge eating refers to eating a large amount of food in a short amount of time. Purging refers to the attempts to get rid of the food consumed.
- Buttocks – are two rounded portions of the anatomy, located on the posterior of the pelvic region and comprise a layer of fat superimposed on the gluteus maximus and gluteus medius muscles. Physiologically, the buttocks enable weight to be taken off the feet while sitting.

== C ==
- Calcium – Calcium ions (Ca^{2+}) contribute to the physiology and biochemistry of organisms and the cell. They play an important role in signal transduction pathways, where they act as a second messenger, in neurotransmitter release from neurons, in contraction of all muscle cell types, and in fertilization. Many enzymes require calcium ions as a cofactor, those of the blood-clotting cascade being notable examples. Extracellular calcium is also important for maintaining the potential difference across excitable cell membranes, as well as proper bone formation.
- Calf – is the back portion of the lower leg in human anatomy. The muscles within the calf correspond to the posterior compartment of the leg. The two largest muscles within this compartment are known together as the calf muscle and attach to the heel via the Achilles tendon. Several other, smaller muscles attach to the knee, the ankle, and via long tendons to the toes.
- Cancer – is a group of diseases involving abnormal cell growth with the potential to invade or spread to other parts of the body. These contrast with benign tumors, which do not spread to other parts of the body.
- Capillary – is a small blood vessel from 5 to 10 micrometres (μm) in diameter, and having a wall one endothelial cell thick. They are the smallest blood vessels in the body: they convey blood between the arterioles and venules. These microvessels are the site of exchange of many substances with the interstitial fluid surrounding them.
- Carcinogen – is any substance, radionuclide, or radiation that promotes carcinogenesis, the formation of cancer. This may be due to the ability to damage the genome or to the disruption of cellular metabolic processes.
- Carcinogenesis – also called oncogenesis or tumorigenesis, is the formation of a cancer, whereby normal cells are transformed into cancer cells.
- Cardiac arrest – a sudden loss of blood flow resulting from the failure of the heart to effectively pump. Symptoms include loss of consciousness and abnormal or absent breathing. Some individuals may experience chest pain, shortness of breath, or nausea before cardiac arrest. If not treated within minutes, it typically leads to death.
- Cardiac catheterization – (heart cath or just cath), is the insertion of a catheter into a chamber or vessel of the heart. This is done both for diagnostic and interventional purposes.
- Cardiac muscle – (also called heart muscle or myocardium), is one of three types of vertebrate muscles, with the other two being skeletal and smooth muscles. It is an involuntary, striated muscle that constitutes the main tissue of the walls of the heart. The myocardium forms a thick middle layer between the outer layer of the heart wall (the epicardium) and the inner layer (the endocardium), with blood supplied via the coronary circulation. It is composed of individual heart muscle cells (cardiomyocytes) joined by intercalated discs, encased by collagen fibres and other substances that form the extracellular matrix.
- Cardiac surgery – or cardiovascular surgery, is surgery on the heart or great vessels performed by cardiac surgeons. It is often used to treat complications of ischemic heart disease (for example, with coronary artery bypass grafting); to correct congenital heart disease; or to treat valvular heart disease from various causes, including endocarditis, rheumatic heart disease, and atherosclerosis. It also includes heart transplantation.
- Cardiology – is a branch of medicine dealing with disorders of the heart as well as parts of the circulatory system.
- Cardiothoracic surgery – (also known as thoracic surgery) is the field of medicine involved in surgical treatment of organs inside the thorax (the chest)—generally treatment of conditions of the heart (heart disease) and lungs (lung disease).
- Cardiovascular disease – (CVD), is a class of diseases that involve the heart or blood vessels. CVD includes coronary artery diseases (CAD) such as angina and myocardial infarction (commonly known as a heart attack). Other CVDs include stroke, heart failure, hypertensive heart disease, rheumatic heart disease, cardiomyopathy, heart arrhythmia, congenital heart disease, valvular heart disease, carditis, aortic aneurysms, peripheral artery disease, thromboembolic disease, and venous thrombosis.
- Carotid artery, common – In anatomy, the left and right common carotid arteries (carotids)) are arteries that supply the head and neck with oxygenated blood; they divide in the neck to form the external and internal carotid arteries.
- Carotid artery, external – The external carotid artery is a major artery of the head and neck. It arises from the common carotid artery when it splits into the external and internal carotid artery. It supplies blood to the face and neck.
- Carotid artery, internal – The internal carotid artery is a major paired artery, one on each side of the head and neck, in human anatomy. They arise from the common carotid arteries where these bifurcate into the internal and external carotid arteries at cervical vertebral level 3 or 4; the internal carotid artery supplies the brain, while the external carotid nourishes other portions of the head, such as face, scalp, skull, and meninges.
- Carotid artery stenosis – is a narrowing or constriction of any part of the carotid arteries, usually caused by atherosclerosis.
- Carpal bones – Are the eight small bones that make up the wrist (or carpus) that connects the hand to the forearm. In human anatomy, the main role of the wrist is to facilitate effective positioning of the hand and powerful use of the extensors and flexors of the forearm, and the mobility of individual carpal bones increase the freedom of movements at the wrist.
- Carpal tunnel syndrome – (CTS), is a medical condition due to compression of the median nerve as it travels through the wrist at the carpal tunnel. The main symptoms are pain, numbness and tingling in the thumb, index finger, middle finger and the thumb side of the ring fingers.
- Cartilage – is a resilient and smooth elastic tissue, a rubber-like padding that covers and protects the ends of long bones at the joints, and is a structural component of the rib cage, the ear, the nose, the bronchial tubes, the intervertebral discs, and many other body components. It is not as hard and rigid as bone, but it is much stiffer and much less flexible than muscle. The matrix of cartilage is made up of chondrin.
- Cartilaginous joint – Cartilaginous joints are connected entirely by cartilage (fibrocartilage or hyaline). Cartilaginous joints allow more movement between bones than a fibrous joint but less than the highly mobile synovial joint. Cartilaginous joints also forms the growth regions of immature long bones and the intervertebral discs of the spinal column.
- Catheter – Is a thin tube made from medical grade materials serving a broad range of functions. Catheters are medical devices that can be inserted in the body to treat diseases or perform a surgical procedure. By modifying the material or adjusting the way catheters are manufactured, it is possible to tailor catheters for cardiovascular, urological, gastrointestinal, neurovascular, and ophthalmic applications.
- Celiac disease – another way of spelling coeliac disease
- Cell biology – also called cytology, is a branch of biology that studies the structure and function of the cell, which is the basic unit of life. Cell biology is concerned with the physiological properties, metabolic processes, signaling pathways, life cycle, chemical composition and interactions of the cell with their environment.
- Central nervous system – (CNS), is the part of the nervous system consisting of the brain and spinal cord.
- Cephalic vein – is a superficial vein in the arm. It communicates with the basilic vein via the median cubital vein at the elbow and is located in the superficial fascia along the anterolateral surface of the biceps brachii muscle. Near the shoulder, the cephalic vein passes between the deltoid and pectoralis major muscles (deltopectoral groove) and through the deltopectoral triangle, where it empties into the axillary vein.
- Cerebellum – (Latin for "little brain"), is a major feature of the hindbrain of all vertebrates. Although usually smaller than the cerebrum, in some animals such as the mormyrid fishes it may be as large as or even larger. In humans, the cerebellum plays an important role in motor control. It may also be involved in some cognitive functions such as attention and language as well as in regulating fear and pleasure responses, but its movement-related functions are the most solidly established. The human cerebellum does not initiate movement, but contributes to coordination, precision, and accurate timing: it receives input from sensory systems of the spinal cord and from other parts of the brain, and integrates these inputs to fine-tune motor activity. Cerebellar damage produces disorders in fine movement, equilibrium, posture, and motor learning in humans.
- Cerebrum – is a large part of the brain containing the cerebral cortex (of the two cerebral hemispheres), as well as several subcortical structures, including the hippocampus, basal ganglia, and olfactory bulb. In the human brain, the cerebrum is the uppermost region of the central nervous system. The prosencephalon is the embryonic structure from which the cerebrum develops prenatally. In mammals, the dorsal telencephalon, or pallium, develops into the cerebral cortex, and the ventral telencephalon, or subpallium, becomes the basal ganglia. The cerebrum is also divided into approximately symmetric left and right cerebral hemispheres. With the assistance of the cerebellum, the cerebrum controls all voluntary actions in the body.
- Cervical cancer – is a cancer arising from the cervix. It is due to the abnormal growth of cells that have the ability to invade or spread to other parts of the body. Early on, typically no symptoms are seen. Later symptoms may include abnormal vaginal bleeding, pelvic pain, or pain during sexual intercourse. While bleeding after sex may not be serious, it may also indicate the presence of cervical cancer.
- Cervix – or cervix uteri, is the lower part of the uterus in the human female reproductive system. The cervix is usually 2 to 3 cm long (~1 inch) and roughly cylindrical in shape, which changes during pregnancy. The narrow, central cervical canal runs along its entire length, connecting the uterine cavity and the lumen of the vagina. The opening into the uterus is called the internal os, and the opening into the vagina is called the external os. The lower part of the cervix, known as the vaginal portion of the cervix (or ectocervix), bulges into the top of the vagina.
- Cheek – The cheeks constitute the area of the face below the eyes and between the nose and the left or right ear. "Buccal" means relating to the cheek. In humans, the region is innervated by the buccal nerve. The area between the inside of the cheek and the teeth and gums is called the vestibule or buccal pouch or buccal cavity and forms part of the mouth.
- Chin – is the area of the face below the lower lip and including the mandibular prominence. It is formed by the lower front of the mandible.
- Chronic fatigue syndrome – (CFS), also referred to as myalgic encephalomyelitis (ME), is a medical condition characterized by long-term fatigue and other persistent symptoms that limit a person's ability to carry out ordinary daily activities.
- Ciliary muscle – is a ring of smooth muscle in the eye's middle layer (vascular layer) that controls accommodation for viewing objects at varying distances and regulates the flow of aqueous humor into Schlemm's canal. It changes the shape of the lens within the eye, not the size of the pupil which is carried out by the sphincter pupillae muscle and dilator pupillae.
- Ciliary sulcus – The space between the anterior surface of the ciliary body of the eye and the posterior surface of the base of the iris. It is one of the sites for intraocular lens implantation.
- Circulatory system – The circulatory system, also called the cardiovascular system or the vascular system, is an organ system that permits blood to circulate and transport nutrients (such as amino acids and electrolytes), oxygen, carbon dioxide, hormones, and blood cells to and from the cells in the body to provide nourishment and help in fighting diseases, stabilize temperature and pH, and maintain homeostasis.
- Clavicle – also known as the collar bone, is a long bone that serves as a strut between the shoulder blade and the sternum. There are two, one on the right, and one on the left side of the trunk. Along with the shoulder blade, the clavicles make up the shoulder girdle. The clavicle has many functions. It connects the axial and appendicular skeleton in conjunction with the scapula, helps extend range of motion, and protects neurovascular structures.
- Clinic – (or outpatient clinic or ambulatory care clinic) is a healthcare facility that is primarily focused on the care of outpatients. Clinics can be privately operated or publicly managed and funded.
- Clinical research – is a branch of healthcare science that determines the safety and effectiveness (efficacy) of medications, devices, diagnostic products and treatment regimens intended for human use. These may be used for prevention, treatment, diagnosis or for relieving symptoms of a disease. Clinical research is different from clinical practice. In clinical practice established treatments are used, while in clinical research evidence is collected to establish a treatment.
- Coeliac disease – Coeliac disease or celiac disease is a long-term autoimmune disorder that primarily affects the small intestine. Classic symptoms include gastrointestinal problems such as chronic diarrhoea, abdominal distention, malabsorption, loss of appetite and among children failure to grow normally. This often begins between six months and two years of age. Non-classic symptoms are more common, especially in people older than two years. There may be mild or absent gastrointestinal symptoms, a wide number of symptoms involving any part of the body or no obvious symptoms. Coeliac disease was first described in childhood; however, it may develop at any age. It is associated with other autoimmune diseases, such as diabetes mellitus type 1 and thyroiditis, among others.
- Colorectal surgery – is a field in medicine dealing with disorders of the rectum, anus, and colon.
- Common carotid artery – In anatomy, the left and right common carotid arteries (carotids)) are arteries that supply the head and neck with oxygenated blood; they divide in the neck to form the external and internal carotid arteries.
- Common cold – also known simply as a cold, is a viral infectious disease of the upper respiratory tract that primarily affects the nose. The throat, sinuses, and larynx may also be affected. Signs and symptoms may appear less than two days after exposure to the virus. These may include coughing, sore throat, runny nose, sneezing, headache, and fever. People usually recover in seven to ten days, but some symptoms may last up to three weeks. Occasionally, those with other health problems may develop pneumonia.
- Common iliac artery – The common iliac arteries are two large arteries that originate from the aortic bifurcation at the level of the fourth lumbar vertebra. They end in front of the sacroiliac joint, one on either side, and each bifurcates into the external and internal iliac arteries.
- Common iliac vein – The common iliac veins are formed by the external iliac veins and internal iliac veins. The left and right common iliac veins come together in the abdomen at the level of the fifth lumbar vertebra, forming the inferior vena cava. They drain blood from the pelvis and lower limbs. Both common iliac veins are accompanied along their course by common iliac arteries.
- Coronary arteries – are the blood vessels (arteries) of coronary circulation, which transports oxygenated blood to the actual heart muscle. The heart requires a continuous supply of oxygen to function and survive, much like any other tissue or organ of the body.
- Corpus callosum – also callosal commissure, is a wide, thick nerve tract consisting of a flat bundle of commissural fibers, beneath the cerebral cortex in the brain. The corpus callosum is only found in placental mammals. It spans part of the longitudinal fissure, connecting the left and right cerebral hemispheres, enabling communication between them. It is the largest white matter structure in the human brain, about ten centimetres in length and consisting of 200–300 million axonal projections.
- Cranial nerves – are the nerves that emerge directly from the brain (including the brainstem), in contrast to spinal nerves (which emerge from segments of the spinal cord). Ten of the cranial nerves originate in the brainstem. Cranial nerves relay information between the brain and parts of the body, primarily to and from regions of the head and neck.
- Cure – is a substance or procedure that ends a medical condition, such as a medication, a surgical operation, a change in lifestyle or even a philosophical mindset that helps end a person's sufferings; or the state of being healed, or cured.
- Cytogenetics – is a branch of genetics that is concerned with how the chromosomes relate to cell behaviour, particularly to their behaviour during mitosis and meiosis.
- Cytokines – are a broad and loose category of small proteins (~5–20 kDa) that are important in cell signaling. Cytokines are peptides, and cannot cross the lipid bilayer of cells to enter the cytoplasm.

== D ==
- Decompression sickness – is a condition caused by inert gas bubbles forming in supersaturated tissues after a reduction in ambient pressure, and either obstructing perfusion or causing local damage.
- Deep circumflex iliac vein – is formed by the union of the venae comitantes of the deep iliac circumflex artery, and joins the external iliac vein about 2 cm. above the inguinal ligament. It also receives small tributary branches from the thoracoepigastric vein
- Deep temporal arteries – The deep temporal arteries, two in number, anterior and posterior, ascend between the temporalis and the pericranium. They supply the muscle, and anastomose with the middle temporal artery. The anterior communicates with the lacrimal artery by means of small branches which perforate the zygomatic bone and great wing of the sphenoid.
- Definitive treatment – Medical treatment generally accepted as most appropriate for the condition.
- Deltoid muscle – is the muscle forming the rounded contour of the human shoulder. Anatomically, it appears to be made up of three distinct sets of fibers though electromyography suggests that it consists of at least seven groups that can be independently coordinated by the nervous system.
- Dentistry – also known as Dental and Oral Medicine, is a branch of medicine that consists of the study, diagnosis, prevention, and treatment of diseases, disorders, and conditions of the oral cavity, commonly in the dentition but also the oral mucosa, and of adjacent and related structures and tissues, particularly in the maxillofacial (jaw and facial) area.
- Dermatitis – also known as eczema, is a group of diseases that result in inflammation of the skin. These diseases are characterized by itchiness, red skin and a rash. In cases of short duration, there may be small blisters, while in long-term cases the skin may become thickened. The area of skin involved can vary from small to the entire body.
- Diagnosis – Medical diagnosis (abbreviated Dx or D_{S}) is the process of determining which disease or condition explains a person's symptoms and signs. It is most often referred to as diagnosis with the medical context being implicit. The information required for diagnosis is typically collected from a history and physical examination of the person seeking medical care. Often, one or more diagnostic procedures, such as medical tests, are also done during the process. Sometimes posthumous diagnosis is considered a kind of medical diagnosis.
- Diabetes mellitus – (DM), commonly known as diabetes, is a group of metabolic disorders characterized by a high blood sugar level over a prolonged period. Symptoms of high blood sugar include frequent urination, increased thirst, and increased hunger. If left untreated, diabetes can cause many complications. Acute complications can include diabetic ketoacidosis, hyperosmolar hyperglycemic state, or death. Serious long-term complications include cardiovascular disease, stroke, chronic kidney disease, foot ulcers, and damage to the eyes.
- Dietary reference intake – (DRI), is a system of nutrition recommendations from the Institute of Medicine (IOM) of the National Academies (United States).
- Differential diagnosis – is the distinguishing of a particular disease or condition from others that present similar clinical features.
- Digestive system – The human digestive system consists of the gastrointestinal tract plus the accessory organs of digestion (the tongue, salivary glands, pancreas, liver, and gallbladder). Digestion involves the breakdown of food into smaller and smaller components, until they can be absorbed and assimilated into the body.
- Disease – is an abnormal condition in an organism, or part of it, that negatively affects structure or function. Disease can be caused by external factors, or internal dysfunctions, such as abnormal immune responses.
- Dysbarism

== E ==
- Ear – is the organ of hearing and, in mammals, balance. In mammals, the ear is usually described as having three parts—the outer ear, the middle ear and the inner ear. The outer ear consists of the pinna and the ear canal. Since the outer ear is the only visible portion of the ear in most animals, the word "ear" often refers to the external part alone. The middle ear includes the tympanic cavity and the three ossicles. The inner ear sits in the bony labyrinth, and contains structures which are key to several senses: the semicircular canals, which enable balance and eye tracking when moving; the utricle and saccule, which enable balance when stationary; and the cochlea, which enables hearing. The ears of vertebrates are placed somewhat symmetrically on either side of the head, an arrangement that aids sound localisation.
- Ear infection – Otitis is a general term for inflammation or infection of the ear, in both humans and other animals. It is subdivided into the following:

Otitis externa, external otitis, or "swimmer's ear", involves the outer ear and ear canal. In external otitis, the ear hurts when touched or pulled.
Otitis media, or middle ear infection, involves the middle ear. In otitis media, the ear is infected or clogged with fluid behind the ear drum, in the normally air-filled middle-ear space. This very common childhood infection sometimes requires a surgical procedure called myringotomy and tube insertion.
Otitis interna, or labyrinthitis, involves the inner ear. The inner ear includes sensory organs for balance and hearing. When the inner ear is inflamed, vertigo is a common symptom.

- Elbow – is the visible joint between the upper and lower parts of the arm. It includes prominent landmarks such as the olecranon, the elbow pit, the lateral and medial epicondyles, and the elbow joint. The elbow joint is the synovial hinge joint between the humerus in the upper arm and the radius and ulna in the forearm which allows the forearm and hand to be moved towards and away from the body.
- Embryology – is the branch of biology that studies the prenatal development of gametes (sex cells), fertilization, and development of embryos and fetuses. Additionally, embryology encompasses the study of congenital disorders that occur before birth, known as teratology.
- Emergency medicine – also known as accident and emergency medicine, is the medical specialty concerned with the care of illnesses or injuries requiring immediate medical attention. Emergency physicians care for unscheduled and undifferentiated patients of all ages. As first-line providers, their primary responsibility is to initiate resuscitation and stabilization and to start investigations and interventions to diagnose and treat illnesses in the acute phase.
- Endocrine system – is a chemical messenger system comprising feedback loops of hormones released by internal glands of an organism directly into the circulatory system, regulating distant target organs. In humans, the major endocrine glands are the thyroid gland and the adrenal glands. In vertebrates, the hypothalamus is the neural control center for all endocrine systems. The study of the endocrine system and its disorders is known as endocrinology. Endocrinology is a branch of internal medicine.
- Endocrinology – is a branch of biology and medicine dealing with the endocrine system, its diseases, and its specific secretions known as hormones. It is also concerned with the integration of developmental events proliferation, growth, and differentiation, and the psychological or behavioral activities of metabolism, growth and development, tissue function, sleep, digestion, respiration, excretion, mood, stress, lactation, movement, reproduction, and sensory perception caused by hormones. Specializations include behavioral endocrinology and comparative endocrinology.
- Epidemiology – is the study and analysis of the distribution (who, when, and where), patterns and determinants of health and disease conditions in defined populations. It is a cornerstone of public health, and shapes policy decisions and evidence-based practice by identifying risk factors for disease and targets for preventive healthcare. Epidemiologists help with study design, collection, and statistical analysis of data, amend interpretation and dissemination of results (including peer review and occasional systematic review). Epidemiology has helped develop methodology used in clinical research, public health studies, and, to a lesser extent, basic research in the biological sciences.
- Epiglottis – is a leaf-shaped flap in the throat that prevents food from entering the windpipe and the lungs. It stands open during breathing, allowing air into the larynx. During swallowing, it closes to prevent aspiration of food into the lungs, forcing the swallowed liquids or food to go along the esophagus toward the stomach instead. It is thus the valve that diverts passage to either the trachea or the esophagus.
- Epilepsy – is a group of neurological disorders characterized by recurrent epileptic seizures. Epileptic seizures are episodes that can vary from brief and nearly undetectable periods to long periods of vigorous shaking. These episodes can result in physical injuries, including occasionally broken bones. In epilepsy, seizures have a tendency to recur and, as a rule, have no immediate underlying cause. Isolated seizures that are provoked by a specific cause such as poisoning are not deemed to represent epilepsy.
- Erectile dysfunction – (ED), also called impotence, is the type of sexual dysfunction in which the penis fails to become or stay erect during sexual activity. It is the most common sexual problem in men. Through its connection to self-image and to problems in sexual relationships, erectile dysfunction can cause psychological harm.
- Erector spinae muscles – The erector spinae or spinal erectors is a set of muscles that straighten and rotate the back.
- Esophagus – The esophagus, (American English) or oesophagus (British English; see spelling differences) (/ɪˈsɒfəɡəs/), informally known as the food pipe or gullet, is an organ in vertebrates through which food passes, aided by peristaltic contractions, from the pharynx to the stomach. The esophagus is a fibromuscular tube, about 25 cm (10 in) long in adults, which travels behind the trachea and heart, passes through the diaphragm and empties into the uppermost region of the stomach. During swallowing, the epiglottis tilts backwards to prevent food from going down the larynx and lungs.
- Expedition medicine – The medical specialty concerned with the medical care, planning, and prevention for expeditions in remote and resource-limited settings.
- Extensor pollicis brevis muscle – In human anatomy, the extensor pollicis brevis is a skeletal muscle on the dorsal side of the forearm. It lies on the medial side of, and is closely connected with, the abductor pollicis longus.
- Extensor pollicis et indicis communis muscle – In human anatomy, the extensor pollicis et indicis communis is an aberrant muscle in the posterior compartment of forearm. It was first described in 1863. The muscle has a prevalence from 0.5% to 4%.
- Extensor pollicis longus muscle – In human anatomy, the extensor pollicis longus muscle (EPL) is a skeletal muscle located dorsally on the forearm. It is much larger than the extensor pollicis brevis, the origin of which it partly covers and acts to stretch the thumb together with this muscle.
- External carotid artery – is a major artery of the head and neck. It arises from the common carotid artery when it splits into the external and internal carotid artery. External carotid artery supplies blood to the face and neck.
- External iliac artery – The external iliac arteries are two major arteries which bifurcate off the common iliac arteries anterior to the sacroiliac joint of the pelvis.
- External iliac vein – The external iliac veins are large veins that connect the femoral veins to the common iliac veins. Their origin is at the inferior margin of the inguinal ligaments and they terminate when they join the internal iliac veins (to form the common iliac veins). Both external iliac veins are accompanied along their course by external iliac arteries.
- External jugular vein – receives the greater part of the blood from the exterior of the cranium and the deep parts of the face, being formed by the junction of the posterior division of the retromandibular vein with the posterior auricular vein.
- Eye – The human eye is a sense organ that reacts to light and allows vision. Rod and cone cells in the retina are photoreceptive cells which are able to detect visible light and convey this information to the brain. Eyes signal information which is used by the brain to elicit the perception of color, shape, depth, movement, and other features. The eye is part of the sensory nervous system. Similar to the eyes of other mammals, the human eye's non-image-forming photosensitive ganglion cells in the retina receive light signals which affect adjustment of the size of the pupil, regulation and suppression of the hormone melatonin, and entrainment of the circadian rhythm.
- Eye surgery – also known as ophthalmic surgery, is a medical procedure performed on the eye or its surrounding tissues to treat various conditions, improve vision, or correct eye disorders.

== F ==
- Face – is the front of an animal's head that features three of the head's sense organs, the eyes, nose, and mouth, and through which animals express many of their emotions. The face is crucial for human identity, and damage such as scarring or developmental deformities affects the psyche adversely.
- Fallopian tube – The fallopian tubes, also known as uterine tubes or salpinges (singular salpinx), are tubes that stretch from the uterus to the ovaries, and are part of the female reproductive system. The fertilized egg passes through the fallopian tubes from the ovaries of female mammals to the uterus. The fallopian tube is simple columnar epithelium with hair-like extensions called cilia which carry the fertilized egg. In other animals, the equivalent of a fallopian tube is an oviduct.
- Fellowship (medicine) – is the period of medical training, in the United States and Canada, that a physician, dentist, or veterinarian may undertake after completing a specialty training program (residency). During this time (usually more than one year), the physician is known as a fellow. Fellows are capable of acting as an attending physician or a consultant physician in the specialist field in which they were trained, such as Internal Medicine or Pediatrics. After completing a fellowship in the relevant sub-specialty, the physician is permitted to practice without direct supervision by other physicians in that sub-specialty, such as Cardiology or Oncology.
- Female reproductive system – is made up of the internal and external sex organs that function in reproduction of new offspring. In humans, the female reproductive system is immature at birth and develops to maturity at puberty to be able to produce gametes, and to carry a foetus to full term. The internal sex organs are the uterus, fallopian tubes, and ovaries. The uterus or womb accommodates the embryo which develops into the foetus. The uterus also produces vaginal and uterine secretions which help the transit of sperm to the fallopian tubes. The ovaries produce the ova (egg cells). The external sex organs are also known as the genitals and these are the organs of the vulva including the labia, clitoris, and vaginal opening. The vagina is connected to the uterus at the cervix.
- Femoral artery – is a large artery in the thigh and the main arterial supply to the thigh and leg. It enters the thigh from behind the inguinal ligament as the continuation of the external iliac artery.
- Femoral nerve – is a nerve in the thigh that supplies skin on the upper thigh and inner leg, and the muscles that extend the knee.
- Femoral vein – In the human body, the femoral vein is a blood vessel that accompanies the femoral artery in the femoral sheath. It begins at the adductor hiatus (an opening in the adductor magnus muscle) and is a continuation of the popliteal vein. It ends at the inferior margin of the inguinal ligament, where it becomes the external iliac vein. The femoral vein bears valves which are mostly bicuspid and whose number is variable between individuals and often between left and right leg.
- Femur – The femur, or thigh bone, is the proximal bone of the hindlimb in tetrapod vertebrate, the largest bone of the human body. The head of the femur articulates with the acetabulum in the pelvic bone forming the hip joint, while the distal part of the femur articulates with the tibia and kneecap, forming the knee joint.
- Fibromyalgia – a chronic condition characterized by widespread pain in muscles and soft tissues throughout the body. It is believed to affect how the brain and spinal cord process pain signals, leading to increased sensitivity to pain.
- Fibrous joint – a type of joint in the human body where adjacent bones are connected by fibrous connective tissue. These joints are characterized by their lack of a joint cavity and minimal to no movement, making them classified as synarthroses.
- Fibula – is a long bone located on the lateral side of the tibia in the leg. It is the smaller of the two bones in the lower leg and plays a crucial role in maintaining stability and supporting the ankle joint.
- Finger – is one of the digits located on the hand of a human or animal, typically used for gripping, touching, or manipulating objects. Each finger consists of three little bones known as phalanges, which confer structure and strength. These bones are interconnected by joints encased in muscles, tendons, and ligaments, facilitating smooth movement.
- First aid – is the immediate assistance provided to someone who is injured or ill, aimed at preserving life, preventing the condition from worsening, and promoting recovery until professional medical help arrives.
- Flat bone – are one of the main types of bones in the human body, characterized by their thin and flattened shape. They consist of two layers of compact bone surrounding a layer of spongy bone, which contains red bone marrow. This structure provides strength while keeping the bones lightweight, allowing them to effectively protect underlying organs and serve as attachment points for muscles.
- Foot – The foot is a complex anatomical structure made up of multiple joints, muscles, tendons, ligaments, and a network of blood vessels and nerves that are intended to support weight, allow movement, and maintain balance. It is divided into three sections: the forefoot (toes and metatarsals), the midfoot (arch-forming bones), and the hindfoot (heel and ankle). Crucial bones include the calcaneus (heel bone), talus (ankle bone), and tarsals. The plantar fascia is a thick band of connective tissue that supports the arch and absorbs trauma. Plantar fasciitis, bunions, flat feet, and fractures are all common foot-related medical conditions.
- Forearm – is the region of the upper limb located between the elbow and the wrist. It consists of two bones, the radius and the ulna, and contains 20 muscles that facilitate various movements, such as bending and rotating the wrist and hand. The forearm plays a crucial role in force application and the precise placement of the hand in space, aided by the elbow and distal and proximal radioulnar joints.
- Forehead – is the area of the face located above the eyes and below the hairline. It constitutes the upper third of the face and is bounded by the hairline at the top, the eyebrows at the bottom, and the glabella (the smooth part of the forehead between the eyebrows) centrally.
- Frontal bone –
- Frontal nerve – is the largest branch of the ophthalmic nerve (V_{1}), itself a branch of the trigeminal nerve (CN V). The frontal nerve branches from the ophthalmic nerve immediately before entering the superior orbital fissure. In then travels superolateral to the annulus of Zinn between the lacrimal nerve and inferior ophthalmic vein. After entering the orbit it travels anteriorly between the roof periosteum and the levator palpebrae superioris. Midway between the apex and base of the orbit it divides into two branches, the supratrochlear nerve and supraorbital nerve. The two branches of the frontal nerve provide sensory innervation to the skin of the forehead, mucosa of the frontal sinus, and the skin of the upper eyelid.
- Frontalis muscle – is a thin, flat muscle located on the forehead. It originates from the galea aponeurotica and inserts into the skin of the eyebrows, playing a key role in facial expressions by raising the eyebrows and wrinkling the forehead. Innervated by the temporal branch of the facial nerve (cranial nerve VII), it helps convey emotions like surprise or concern. Its activity is also relevant in clinical conditions such as Bell's palsy and cosmetic procedures like Botox, which target its function to reduce forehead lines.

== G ==
- Gallbladder – In vertebrates, the gallbladder is a small hollow organ where bile is stored and concentrated before it is released into the small intestine. In humans, the pear-shaped gallbladder lies beneath the liver, although the structure and position of the gallbladder can vary significantly among animal species. It receives and stores bile, produced by the liver, via the common hepatic duct and releases it via the common bile duct into the duodenum, where the bile helps in the digestion of fats.
- Gamete – is a haploid cell that fuses with another haploid cell during fertilization in organisms that reproduce sexually. Gametes are an organism's reproductive cells, also referred to as sex cells.
- Ganglion – is a group of neuron cell bodies in the peripheral nervous system. In the somatic nervous system this includes dorsal root ganglia and trigeminal ganglia among a few others. In the autonomic nervous system there are both sympathetic and parasympathetic ganglia which contain the cell bodies of postganglionic sympathetic and parasympathetic neurons respectively.
- Gastrocnemius muscle – (plural gastrocnemii) is a superficial two-headed muscle that is in the back part of the lower leg of humans. It runs from its two heads just above the knee to the heel, a three joint muscle (knee, ankle and subtalar joints). The muscle is named via Latin, from Greek γαστήρ (gaster) 'belly' or 'stomach' and κνήμη (knḗmē) 'leg', meaning 'stomach of leg' (referring to the bulging shape of the calf).
- Gastroenterology – Gastroenterology is the branch of medicine focused on the digestive system and its disorders. Diseases affecting the gastrointestinal tract, which include the organs from mouth into anus, along the alimentary canal, are the focus of this speciality.
- Gastrointestinal tract – The gastrointestinal tract, (GI tract, GIT, digestive tract, digestion tract, alimentary canal) is the tract from the mouth to the anus which includes all the organs of the digestive system in humans and other animals. Food taken in through the mouth is digested to extract nutrients and absorb energy, and the waste expelled as feces. The mouth, esophagus, stomach and intestines are all part of the gastrointestinal tract. Gastrointestinal is an adjective meaning of or pertaining to the stomach and intestines. A tract is a collection of related anatomic structures or a series of connected body organs.
- Gene therapy – (also called human gene transfer) is a medical field which focuses on the utilization of the therapeutic delivery of nucleic acids into a patient's cells as a drug to treat disease.
- General surgery – is a surgical specialty that focuses on abdominal contents including esophagus, stomach, small intestine, large intestine, liver, pancreas, gallbladder, appendix and bile ducts, and often the thyroid gland (depending on local referral patterns). They also deal with diseases involving the skin, breast, soft tissue, trauma, Peripheral artery disease and hernias and perform endoscopic procedures such as gastroscopy and colonoscopy.
- Genetics – is a branch of biology concerned with the study of genes, genetic variation, and heredity in organisms.
- Genitourinary system – The genitourinary system, or urogenital system, are the organs of the reproductive system and the urinary system. These are grouped together because of their proximity to each other, their common embryological origin and the use of common pathways, like the male urethra. Also, because of their proximity, the systems are sometimes imaged together.
- Geriatrics – or geriatric medicine, is a specialty that focuses on health care of elderly people. It aims to promote health by preventing and treating diseases and disabilities in older adults. There is no set age at which patients may be under the care of a geriatrician, or geriatric physician, a physician who specializes in the care of elderly people. Rather, this decision is determined by the individual patient's needs, and the availability of a specialist. There is a difference between geriatrics, the care of aged people, and gerontology, which is the study of the aging process itself. The term geriatrics comes from the Greek γέρων geron meaning "old man", and ιατρός iatros meaning "healer". However, geriatrics is sometimes called medical gerontology.
- Gonad – A gonad, sex gland, or reproductive gland is a mixed gland that produces the gametes (sex cells) and sex hormones of an organism. In the female of the species the reproductive cells are the egg cells, and in the male the reproductive cells are the sperm. The male gonad, the testicle, produces sperm in the form of spermatozoa. The female gonad, the ovary, produces egg cells. Both of these gametes are haploid cells. Some hermaphroditic animals have a type of gonad called an ovotestis.
- Gout – is a form of inflammatory arthritis characterized by recurrent attacks of a red, tender, hot, and swollen joint. Pain typically comes on rapidly, reaching maximal intensity in less than 12 hours. The joint at the base of the big toe is affected in about half of cases. It may also result in tophi, kidney stones, or urate nephropathy.
- Gracilis muscle – is the most superficial muscle on the medial side of the thigh. It is thin and flattened, broad above, narrow and tapering below.
- Great saphenous vein – (GSV, alternately "long saphenous vein"; /səˈfiːnəs/) is a large, subcutaneous, superficial vein of the leg. It is the longest vein in the body, running along the length of the lower limb, returning blood from the foot, leg and thigh to the deep femoral vein at the femoral triangle.
- The guarding reflex in the urinary system is the gradual tightening of the external urethral sphincter, which prevents urine from exiting the bladder as the bladder fills and pressure on the sphincter increases. At low levels of pressure this occurs unconsciously.
- Gynaecology – or gynecology (see spelling differences) is the medical practice dealing with the health of the female reproductive system. Almost all modern gynaecologists are also obstetricians (see obstetrics and gynaecology). In many areas, the specialities of gynaecology and obstetrics overlap. The term means "the science of women". Its counterpart is andrology, which deals with medical issues specific to the male reproductive system.

== H ==
- Hand – A hand is a prehensile, multi-fingered appendage located at the end of the forearm or forelimb of primates. The human hand normally has five digits: four fingers plus one thumb; these are often referred to collectively as five fingers, however, whereby the thumb is included as one of the fingers. It has 27 bones, not including sesmoid bones, the number of which varies between people, 14 of which are the phalanges (proximal, intermediate and distal) of the fingers and thumb. The metacarpal bones connect the fingers and the carpal bones of the wrist. Each human hand has five metacarpals and eight carpal bones.
- Hand surgery – deals with both surgical and non-surgical treatment of conditions and problems that may take place in the hand or upper extremity (commonly from the tip of the hand to the shoulder) including injury and infection. Hand surgery may be practiced by graduates of general surgery, orthopedic surgery and plastic surgery. Chiroplasty, or cheiroplasty, is plastic surgery of the hands.
- Head – In human anatomy, the head is at the top of the human body. It supports the face and is maintained by the skull, which itself encloses the brain. The human head consists of a fleshy outer portion, which surrounds the bony skull. The brain is enclosed within the skull. There are 22 bones in the human head. The head rests on the neck, and the seven cervical vertebrae support it. The human head typically weighs between 2.3 and 5 kilograms (5.1 and 11.0 lb) The face is the anterior part of the head, containing the eyes, nose, and mouth. On either side of the mouth, the cheeks provide a fleshy border to the oral cavity. The ears sit to either side of the head.
- Health – as defined by the World Health Organization (WHO), is "a state of complete physical, mental and social well-being and not merely the absence of disease or infirmity." This definition has been subject to controversy, as it may have limited value for implementation. Health may be defined as the ability to adapt and manage physical, mental and social challenges throughout life.
- Health care – Health care, health-care, or healthcare is the maintenance or improvement of health via the prevention, diagnosis, treatment, recovery, or cure of disease, illness, injury, and other physical and mental impairments in people. Health care is delivered by health professionals and allied health fields. Physicians and physician associates are a part of these health professionals. Dentistry, pharmacy, midwifery, nursing, medicine, optometry, audiology, psychology, occupational therapy, physical therapy, athletic training and other health professions are all part of health care. It includes work done in providing primary care, secondary care, and tertiary care, as well as in public health.
- Hearing – The ability to perceive sounds through an organ, such as an ear, by detecting vibrations as periodic changes in the pressure of a surrounding medium.
- Heart – A muscular organ that pumps blood through the blood vessels.
- Heel – The prominence at the posterior end of the foot.
- Hematemesis- The vomiting of blood.
- Hematology – The study of blood and blood diseases.
- Hematoma- A localized bleeding outside of blood vessels, due to either disease or trauma including injury or surgery and may involve blood continuing to seep from broken capillaries.
- Hematuria- The presence of blood or red blood cells in the urine.
- Hemodialysis- The process of filtering the blood of a person whose kidneys are not working normally. This type of dialysis achieves the extracorporeal removal of waste products such as creatinine and urea and free water from the blood when the kidneys are in a state of kidney failure.
- Hemolysis- The rupturing of red blood cells and the release of their contents into surrounding fluid.
- Hemopathy- Any disorder or disease of the blood.
- Hemoperfusion- Method of filtering the blood extracorporeally (that is, outside the body) to remove a toxin.
- Hemophilia- A mostly inherited genetic disorder that impairs the body's ability to make blood clots, a process needed to stop bleeding. This results in people bleeding for a longer time after an injury, easy bruising, and an increased risk of bleeding inside joints or the brain.
- Hemoptysis- The discharge of blood or blood-stained mucus through the mouth coming from the bronchi, larynx, trachea, or lungs. In other words, it is the airway bleeding, and does not necessarily involve coughing.
- Hemorrhoid- Vascular structures in the anal canal. In their normal state, they are cushions that help with stool control. They become a disease when swollen or inflamed; the unqualified term hemorrhoid is often used to refer to the disease.
- Hyperhydrosis- A medical condition in which a person exhibits excessive sweating, more than is required for the regulation of body temperature.
- Hyperkalemia- An elevated level of potassium in the blood.
- Hip bone – A large flat bone, constricted in the center and expanded above and below. In some vertebrates (including humans before puberty) it is composed of three parts: the ilium, ischium, and the pubis.
- Histology – The branch of biology that studies the microscopic anatomy of biological tissues.
- Homeostasis – The process by which living organisms maintain relatively stable internal physical and chemical conditions despite changes in their internal or external environment. Body temperature, blood glucose, blood pressure, fluid balance, levels of oxygen and carbon dioxide in the blood, pH, and the concentrations of ions such as sodium, potassium, and calcium are all homeostatically regulated variables.
- Hormone – A class of signaling molecules in multicellular organisms that are sent to distant organs or tissues by complex biological processes to regulate physiology and behavior.
- Hospice – A type of health care that focuses on the palliation (providing relief of pain) of a terminally ill patient's pain and symptoms and attending to their emotional and spiritual needs at the end of life.
- Hospital – A healthcare institution providing patient treatment with specialized medical science and auxiliary healthcare staff and medical equipment.
- Hospital medicine – A medical specialty that exists in some countries as a branch of family medicine or internal medicine, dealing with the care of acutely ill hospitalized patients. Physicians whose primary professional focus is caring for hospitalized patients only while they are in the hospital are called hospitalists
- Humerus – A long bone in the arm that runs from the shoulder to the elbow. It connects the scapula and the two bones of the lower arm, the radius and ulna, and consists of three sections.
- Hydrocele – An accumulation of serous fluid in a body cavity
- Hypersalivation – The excessive production of saliva. It has also been defined as increased amount of saliva in the mouth, which may also be caused by decreased clearance of saliva.
- Hypertension – Also known as high blood pressure, is a long-term medical condition in which the blood pressure in the arteries is persistently elevated

== I ==
- Iliac artery, common – The common iliac arteries are two large arteries that originate from the aortic bifurcation at the level of the fourth lumbar vertebra. They end in front of the sacroiliac joint, one on either side, and each bifurcates into the external and internal iliac arteries.
- Iliac artery, external – The external iliac arteries are two major arteries which bifurcate off the common iliac arteries anterior to the sacroiliac joint of the pelvis. They proceed anterior and inferior along the medial border of the psoas major muscles. They exit the pelvic girdle posterior and inferior to the inguinal ligament about one third laterally from the insertion point of the inguinal ligament on the pubic tubercle at which point they are referred to as the femoral arteries. The external iliac artery is usually the artery used to attach the renal artery to the recipient of a kidney transplant.
- Ilium – (plural ilia), is the uppermost and largest part of the hip bone, and appears in most vertebrates including mammals and birds, but not bony fish. All reptiles have an ilium except snakes, although some snake species have a tiny bone which is considered to be an ilium. The ilium of the human is divisible into two parts, the body and the wing; the separation is indicated on the top surface by a curved line, the arcuate line, and on the external surface by the margin of the acetabulum.
- Immune system – is a network of biological processes that protects an organism against disease. It detects and responds to a wide variety of pathogens, from viruses to parasitic worms, as well as objects such as wood splinters, distinguishing them from the organism's own healthy tissue. Many species have two major subsystems of the immune system. The innate immune system provides a preconfigured response to broad groups of situations and stimuli. The adaptive immune system provides a tailored response to each stimulus by learning to recognize molecules it has previously encountered. Both use molecules and cells to perform their functions.
- Immunohistochemistry – A form of immunostaining. It involves the process of selectively identifying antigens in cells and tissue, by exploiting the principle of antibodies binding specifically to antigens in biological tissues.
- Immunology – is a branch of biology that covers the study of immune systems in all organisms. Immunology charts, measures, and contextualizes the physiological functioning of the immune system in states of both health and diseases; malfunctions of the immune system in immunological disorders (such as autoimmune diseases, hypersensitivities, immune deficiency, and transplant rejection); and the physical, chemical, and physiological characteristics of the components of the immune system in vitro, in situ, and in vivo. Immunology has applications in numerous disciplines of medicine, particularly in the fields of organ transplantation, oncology, rheumatology, virology, bacteriology, parasitology, psychiatry, and dermatology.
- Iliac vein, common – In human anatomy, the common iliac veins are formed by the external iliac veins and internal iliac veins. The left and right common iliac veins come together in the abdomen at the level of the fifth lumbar vertebra, forming the inferior vena cava. They drain blood from the pelvis and lower limbs. Both common iliac veins are accompanied along their course by common iliac arteries.
- Iliac vein, deep circumflex – The deep circumflex iliac vein is formed by the union of the venae comitantes of the deep iliac circumflex artery. It drains venous blood from the walls of the iliac fossa.
- Iliac vein, external – Large veins that connect the femoral veins to the common iliac veins.
- Iliac vein, internal – Begins near the upper part of the greater sciatic foramen, passes upward behind and slightly medial to the internal iliac artery and, at the brim of the pelvis, joins with the external iliac vein to form the common iliac vein.
- Index finger – The second digit of a human hand. It is located between the thumb and the middle finger.
- Infectious diseases (medical specialty) – Also known as infectiology, is a medical specialty dealing with the diagnosis and treatment of infections.
- Inferior oblique muscle – A thin, narrow muscle placed near the anterior margin of the floor of the orbit.
- Inferior thyroid artery – An artery in the neck that serves as a primarily blood supply to the thyroid gland.
- Inferior vena cava – A large vein that carries the deoxygenated blood from the lower and middle body into the right atrium of the heart.
- Influenza – An infectious disease caused by influenza viruses. Symptoms range from mild to severe and often include fever, runny nose, sore throat, muscle pain, headache, coughing, and fatigue.
- Integumentary system – The set of organs forming the outermost layer of an animal's body, comprising the skin, hair, scales, feathers, hooves, claws, and nails. It acts as a protective physical barrier between the external environment and the internal environment.
- Intensive care medicine – A medical specialty that deals with seriously or critically ill patients who have, are at risk of, or are recovering from conditions that may be life-threatening.
- Internal carotid artery – An artery in the neck which supplies the anterior and middle cerebral circulation.
- Internal iliac vein – Begins near the upper part of the greater sciatic foramen, passes upward behind and slightly medial to the internal iliac artery and, at the brim of the pelvis, joins with the external iliac vein to form the common iliac vein.
- Internal jugular vein – A paired jugular vein that collects blood from the brain and the superficial parts of the face and neck. This vein runs in the carotid sheath with the common carotid artery and vagus nerve.
- Internal medicine – A specialty for medical doctors focused on the prevention, diagnosis, and treatment of diseases in adults.
- Internship (medicine) – A physician in training who has completed medical school and has a medical degree, but does not yet have a license to practice medicine unsupervised. Under the guidance of senior doctors, interns will learn how to diagnose and treat patients, handle medical records and deal with different clinical situations.
- Interventional cardiology – A branch of cardiology that deals specifically with the catheter based treatment of structural heart diseases.
- Interventional radiology – A medical specialty that performs various minimally-invasive procedures using medical imaging guidance, such as x-ray fluoroscopy, computed tomography, magnetic resonance imaging, or ultrasound.
- Ischium – A paired bone forming the lower and back part of the hip bone.

== J ==
- Jaundice- also known as icterus, is a yellowish or greenish pigmentation of the skin and whites of the eyes due to high bilirubin levels. It is commonly associated with itchiness. The feces may be pale and the urine dark. Jaundice in babies occurs in over half in the first week following birth and does not pose a serious threat in most. If bilirubin levels in babies are very high for too long, a type of brain damage, known as kernicterus, may occur.
- Jaw – The jaw is any opposable articulated structure at the entrance of the mouth, typically used for grasping and manipulating food. The term jaws is also broadly applied to the whole of the structures constituting the vault of the mouth and serving to open and close it and is part of the body plan of humans and most animals.
- Jejunum- is the second part of the small intestine in humans and most higher vertebrates, including mammals, reptiles, and birds. Its lining is specialised for the absorption by enterocytes of small nutrient molecules which have been previously digested by enzymes in the duodenum.
- Joint – A joint or articulation (or articular surface) is the connection made between bones in the body which link the skeletal system into a functional whole. They are constructed to allow for different degrees and types of movement. Some joints, such as the knee, elbow, and shoulder, are self-lubricating, almost frictionless, and are able to withstand compression and maintain heavy loads while still executing smooth and precise movements. Other joints such as sutures between the bones of the skull permit very little movement (only during birth) in order to protect the brain and the sense organs. The connection between a tooth and the jawbone is also called a joint, and is described as a fibrous joint known as a gomphosis. Joints are classified both structurally and functionally.
- Jugular vein – The jugular veins are veins that take deoxygenated blood from the head back to the heart via the superior vena cava.

== K ==
- Keratogenesis– The production of horny cells in the epidermis.
- Keratopathy- A disease of the cornea.
- Kidney – The kidneys are two reddish-brown bean-shaped organs found in vertebrates. They are located on the left and right in the retroperitoneal space, and in adult humans are about 12 centimetres (4 1/2 inches) in length. They receive blood from the paired renal arteries; blood exits into the paired renal veins. Each kidney is attached to a ureter, a tube that carries excreted urine to the bladder.
- Knee – In humans and other primates, the knee joins the thigh with the leg and consists of two joints: one between the femur and tibia (tibiofemoral joint), and one between the femur and patella (patellofemoral joint). It is the largest joint in the human body. The knee is a modified hinge joint, which permits flexion and extension as well as slight internal and external rotation. The knee is vulnerable to injury and to the development of osteoarthritis.
- Korsakoff syndrome- (KS) is an amnestic disorder caused by thiamine (vitamin B_{1}) deficiency typically associated with prolonged use of alcohol. The syndrome and psychosis are named after Sergei Korsakoff, the Russian neuropsychiatrist who discovered it during the late 19th century. This neurological disorder is caused by a lack of thiamine in the brain, and is also exacerbated by the neurotoxic effects of alcohol. When Wernicke encephalopathy accompanies Korsakoff syndrome the combination is called Wernicke–Korsakoff syndrome; however, a recognized episode of Wernicke encephalopathy is not always obvious.

== L ==
- Large intestine –The large intestine, also known as the large bowel or colon, is the last part of the gastrointestinal tract and of the digestive system in vertebrates. Water is absorbed here and the remaining waste material is stored as feces before being removed by defecation.
- Laryngeal prominence – The Adam's apple, or laryngeal prominence, colloquially known as the neck triangle, is the lump or protrusion in the human neck formed by the angle of the thyroid cartilage surrounding the larynx seen especially in males.
- Laryngeal ventricle – (also called the ventricle of the larynx, laryngeal sinus, or Morgagni's sinus) is a fusiform fossa, situated between the vestibular and vocal folds on either side, and extending nearly their entire length. There is also a sinus of Morgagni in the pharynx.
- Laryngospasm – An uncontrolled or involuntary muscular contraction (spasm) of the vocal folds. It may be triggered when the vocal cords or the area of the trachea below the vocal folds detects the entry of water, mucus, blood, or other substance. It may be associated with stridor or retractions.
- Ligament – is the fibrous connective tissue that connects bones to other bones.
- Lips – are a visible body part at the mouth of many animals, including humans. Lips are soft, movable, and serve as the opening for food intake and in the articulation of sound and speech. Human lips are a tactile sensory organ, and can be an erogenous zone when used in kissing and other acts of intimacy.
- Little finger – or pinky finger, also known as the fifth digit, or pinkie, is the most ulnar and smallest finger of the human hand, opposite the thumb, and next to the ring finger.
- Liver – is an organ only found in vertebrates which detoxifies various metabolites, synthesizes proteins and produces biochemicals necessary for digestion and growth. In humans, it is located in the right upper quadrant of the abdomen, below the diaphragm. Its other roles in metabolism include the regulation of glycogen storage, decomposition of red blood cells, and the production of hormones.
- Long bone – The long bones are those that are longer than they are wide. They are one of five types of bones: long, short, flat, irregular and sesamoid. Long bones, especially the femur and tibia, are subjected to most of the load during daily activities and they are crucial for skeletal mobility. They grow primarily by elongation of the diaphysis, with an epiphysis at each end of the growing bone.
- Lumbar vertebrae – Vertebrae located between the thoracic vertebrae and sacrum. They form the lower part of the back in humans, and the region of the spine between the rib cage and pelvis in quadrupedal mammals. In humans, there are typically five lumbar vertebrae.
- Lung – The lungs are the primary organs of the respiratory system in many animals, including humans. In mammals and most other tetrapods, two lungs are located near the backbone on either side of the heart. Their function in the respiratory system is to extract oxygen from the atmosphere and transfer it into the bloodstream, and to release carbon dioxide from the bloodstream into the atmosphere, in a process of gas exchange.
- Lung cancer – A malignant tumor that originates in the tissues of the lungs. Lung cancer is caused by genetic damage to the DNA of cells in the airways, often caused by cigarette smoking or inhaling damaging chemicals.
- Lupus erythematosus – A collection of autoimmune diseases in which the human immune system becomes hyperactive and attacks healthy tissues. Symptoms of these diseases can affect many different body systems, including joints, skin, kidneys, blood cells, heart, and lungs. The most common and most severe form is systemic lupus erythematosus.
- Lymph – The fluid that flows through the lymphatic system, a system composed of lymph vessels (channels) and intervening lymph nodes whose function, similar to the venous system, is to return fluid from the tissues to be recirculated.
- Lymphatic system – A vital part of the immune system and complementary to the circulatory system. It consists of a large network of lymphatic vessels, lymph nodes, lymphoid organs, lymphatic tissue and lymph. The Latin word for lymph, lympha, refers to the deity of fresh water, "Lympha".
- Lymphatic vessel – Thin-walled vessels (tubes), structured like blood vessels, that carry lymph.
- Lymph node – A kidney-shaped organ of the lymphatic system and the adaptive immune system. A large number of lymph nodes are linked throughout the body by the lymphatic vessels. They are major sites of lymphocytes that include B and T cells. Lymph nodes are important for the proper functioning of the immune system, acting as filters for foreign particles including cancer cells, but have no detoxification function.
- Lymphocyte – A type of white blood cell (leukocyte) in the immune system of most vertebrates.
- Lymphoma - Cancer of the lymphatic system.

== M ==
- Major depressive disorder – (MDD), also known simply as depression, is a mental disorder characterized by at least two weeks of pervasive low mood. Low self-esteem, loss of interest in normally enjoyable activities, low energy, and pain without a clear cause are common symptoms. Those affected may also occasionally have delusions or hallucinations. Some people have periods of depression separated by years, while others nearly always have symptoms present. Major depression is more severe and lasts longer than sadness, which is a normal part of life.
- Male reproductive system –
- Mammary gland –
- Mandible – The mandible, lower jaw or jawbone is the largest, strongest and lowest bone in the human face. It forms the lower jaw and holds the lower teeth in place. The mandible sits beneath the maxilla. It is the only movable bone of the skull (discounting the ossicles of the middle ear).
- Masseter muscle – In human anatomy, the masseter is one of the muscles of mastication. Found only in mammals, it is particularly powerful in herbivores to facilitate chewing of plant matter. The most obvious muscle of mastication is the masseter muscle, since it is the most superficial and one of the strongest.
- Maternal-fetal medicine – (MFM), also known as perinatology, is a branch of medicine that focuses on managing health concerns of the mother and fetus prior to, during, and shortly after pregnancy.
- Maxilla – in vertebrates, is the upper fixed (not fixed in Neopterygii) bone of the jaw formed from the fusion of two maxillary bones. In humans, the upper jaw includes the hard palate in the front of the mouth. The two maxillary bones are fused at the intermaxillary suture, forming the anterior nasal spine. This is similar to the mandible (lower jaw), which is also a fusion of two mandibular bones at the mandibular symphysis. The mandible is the movable part of the jaw.
- MCAT – Medical College Admission Test.
- Medical biology –
- Medical classification – A medical classification is a list of standardized codes used in the process of medical coding and medical billing.
- Medical coding – The practice of assigning statistical codes to medical statements, such as those made during a hospital stay. Closely related to medical billing.
- Medical College Admission Test – (MCAT), is a computer-based standardized examination for prospective medical students in the United States, Australia, Canada, and Caribbean Islands. It is designed to assess problem solving, critical thinking, written analysis and knowledge of scientific concepts and principles.
- Medical device – is any device intended to be used for medical purposes. Medical devices benefit patients by helping health care providers diagnose and treat patients and helping patients overcome sickness or disease, improving their quality of life. Significant potential for hazards are inherent when using a device for medical purposes and thus medical devices must be proved safe and effective with reasonable assurance before regulating governments allow marketing of the device in their country. As a general rule, as the associated risk of the device increases the amount of testing required to establish safety and efficacy also increases. Further, as associated risk increases the potential benefit to the patient must also increase.
- Medical diagnosis – (abbreviated Dx or D_{S}) is the process of determining which disease or condition explains a person's symptoms and signs. It is most often referred to as diagnosis with the medical context being implicit. The information required for diagnosis is typically collected from a history and physical examination of the person seeking medical care. Often, one or more diagnostic procedures, such as medical tests, are also done during the process. Sometimes posthumous diagnosis is considered a kind of medical diagnosis.
- Medical ethics –
- Medical history –
- Medical imaging –
- Medical laboratory –
- Medical research –
- Medical school –
- Medical sign –
- Medical speciality –
- Medication –
- Medulla oblongata –
- Metacarpal bones –
- Metatarsal bones –
- Microbiology –
- Middle finger –
- Middle temporal artery –
- Molecular biology –
- Mouth –
- Muscle –
- Muscular system –
- Musculoskeletal system –

== N ==
- Nail – A nail is a claw-like keratinous plate at the tip of the fingers and toes in most primates. Nails correspond to claws found in other animals. Fingernails and toenails are made of a tough protective protein called alpha-keratin which is found in the hooves, hair, claws and horns of vertebrates.
- Nanobiotechnology – Nanobiotechnology, bionanotechnology, and nanobiology are terms that refer to the intersection of nanotechnology and biology. Given that the subject is one that has only emerged very recently, bionanotechnology and nanobiotechnology serve as blanket terms for various related technologies.
- Nasal cavity – is a large, air-filled space above and behind the nose in the middle of the face. The nasal septum divides the cavity into two cavities, also known as fossae. Each cavity is the continuation of one of the two nostrils. The nasal cavity is the uppermost part of the respiratory system and provides the nasal passage for inhaled air from the nostrils to the nasopharynx and rest of the respiratory tract. The paranasal sinuses surround and drain into the nasal cavity.
- Nasopharynx – The upper portion of the pharynx, the nasopharynx, extends from the base of the skull to the upper surface of the soft palate. It includes the space between the internal nares and the soft palate and lies above the oral cavity. The adenoids, also known as the pharyngeal tonsils, are lymphoid tissue structures located in the posterior wall of the nasopharynx. Waldeyer's tonsillar ring is an annular arrangement of lymphoid tissue in both the nasopharynx and oropharynx. The nasopharynx is lined by respiratory epithelium that is pseudostratified, columnar, and ciliated.
- Navel – The navel (clinically known as the umbilicus, colloquially known as the belly button) is a protruding, flat, or hollowed area on the abdomen at the attachment site of the umbilical cord. All placental mammals have a navel.
- Nephrology – is a specialty of medicine that concerns with study of the kidneys, specifically normal kidney function and kidney disease, the preservation of kidney health, and the treatment of kidney disease, from diet and medication to renal replacement therapy (dialysis and kidney transplantation).
- Nerve – is an enclosed, cable-like bundle of nerve fibres called axons, in the peripheral nervous system. A nerve transmits electrical impulses and is the basic unit of the peripheral nervous system. A nerve provides a common pathway for the electrochemical nerve impulses called action potentials that are transmitted along each of the axons to peripheral organs or, in the case of sensory nerves, from the periphery back to the central nervous system. Each axon within the nerve is an extension of an individual neuron, along with other supportive cells such as some Schwann cells that coat the axons in myelin.
- Nervous system – is a highly complex part of an animal that coordinates its actions and sensory information by transmitting signals to and from different parts of its body. The nervous system detects environmental changes that impact the body, then works in tandem with the endocrine system to respond to such events.
- Neurology – is a branch of medicine dealing with disorders of the nervous system. Neurology deals with the diagnosis and treatment of all categories of conditions and disease involving the central and peripheral nervous systems (and their subdivisions, the autonomic and somatic nervous systems), including their coverings, blood vessels, and all effector tissue, such as muscle. Neurological practice relies heavily on the field of neuroscience, the scientific study of the nervous system.
- Neuroscience – (or neurobiology), is the scientific study of the nervous system. It is a multidisciplinary science that combines physiology, anatomy, molecular biology, developmental biology, cytology, mathematical modeling, and psychology to understand the fundamental and emergent properties of neurons and neural circuits.
- Neurosurgery – or neurological surgery, is the medical specialty concerned with the prevention, diagnosis, surgical treatment, and rehabilitation of disorders which affect any portion of the nervous system including the brain, spinal cord, central and peripheral nervous system, and cerebrovascular system.
- Nose – The human nose is the most protruding part of the face. It bears the nostrils and is the first organ of the respiratory system. It is also the principal organ in the olfactory system. The shape of the nose is determined by the nasal bones and the nasal cartilages, including the nasal septum which separates the nostrils and divides the nasal cavity into two. On average the nose of a male is larger than that of a female.
- Nuclear medicine – is a medical specialty involving the application of radioactive substances in the diagnosis and treatment of disease. Nuclear medicine imaging, in a sense, is "radiology done inside out" or "endoradiology" because it records radiation emitting from within the body rather than radiation that is generated by external sources like X-rays. In addition, nuclear medicine scans differ from radiology, as the emphasis is not on imaging anatomy, but on the function. For such reason, it is called a physiological imaging modality. Single photon emission computed tomography (SPECT) and positron emission tomography (PET) scans are the two most common imaging modalities in nuclear medicine.
- Nutrition – is the science that interprets the nutrients and other substances in food in relation to maintenance, growth, reproduction, health and disease of an organism. It includes ingestion, absorption, assimilation, biosynthesis, catabolism and excretion.

== O ==
- Oblique muscle of auricle – The oblique muscle of auricle (oblique auricular muscle or Tod muscle) is an intrinsic muscle of the outer ear. The oblique muscle of auricle is placed on the cranial surface of the pinna. It consists of a few fibers extending from the upper and back part of the concha to the convexity immediately above it.
- Obstetrics – is the field of study concentrated on pregnancy, childbirth and the postpartum period. As a medical specialty, obstetrics is combined with gynecology under the discipline known as obstetrics and gynecology (OB/GYN), which is a surgical field.
- Obstetrics and gynaecology – Obstetrics and gynaecology (British English) or obstetrics and gynecology (American English) is the medical specialty that encompasses the two subspecialties of obstetrics (covering pregnancy, childbirth, and the postpartum period) and gynecology (covering the health of the female reproductive system – vagina, uterus, ovaries, and breasts). It is commonly abbreviated as OB-GYN or OB/GYN in US English, and as obs and gynae or O&G in British English.
- Occipital bone – is a cranial dermal bone and the main bone of the occiput (back and lower part of the skull). It is trapezoidal in shape and curved on itself like a shallow dish. The occipital bone overlies the occipital lobes of the cerebrum. At the base of skull in the occipital bone, there is a large oval opening called the foramen magnum, which allows the passage of the spinal cord.
- Ocular surgery –
- Olfaction – or the sense of smell, is the process of creating the perception of smell. It occurs when an odor binds to a receptor within the nose, transmitting a signal through the olfactory system. Olfaction has many purposes, including detecting hazards, pheromones, and plays a role in taste.
- Oncology – is a branch of medicine that deals with the prevention, diagnosis, and treatment of cancer. A medical professional who practices oncology is an oncologist.
- Ophthalmology – is a branch of medicine and surgery which deals with the diagnosis and treatment of eye disorders. An ophthalmologist is a specialist in ophthalmology. The credentials include a degree in medicine, followed by additional four to five years of ophthalmology residency training. Ophthalmology residency training programs may require a one-year pre-residency training in internal medicine, pediatrics, or general surgery. Additional specialty training (or fellowship) may be sought in a particular aspect of eye pathology. Ophthalmologists are allowed to use medications to treat eye diseases, implement laser therapy, and perform surgery when needed. Ophthalmologists may participate in academic research on the diagnosis and treatment for eye disorders.
- Optometry – is a health care profession that involves examining the eyes and applicable visual systems for defects or abnormalities as well as prescribing the correction of refractive error with glasses or contact lenses and the treatment of eye diseases.
- Organ – is a group of tissues with similar functions. Plant life and animal life rely on many organs that co-exist in organ systems.
- Oral and maxillofacial surgery – is a surgical specialty focusing on reconstructive surgery of the face, facial trauma surgery, the oral cavity, head and neck, mouth, and jaws, as well as facial cosmetic surgery.
- Orbicularis oculi muscle –
- Orbicularis oris muscle –
- Orthopedic surgery –
- Ossicles –
- Otitis –
- Otorhinolaryngology –
- Ovary –

== P ==
- Palate – is the roof of the mouth in humans and other mammals. It separates the oral cavity from the nasal cavity. A similar structure is found in crocodilians, but in most other tetrapods, the oral and nasal cavities are not truly separated. The palate is divided into two parts, the anterior, bony hard palate and the posterior, fleshy soft palate (or velum).
- Palliative care – (derived from the Latin root palliare, or "to cloak") is an interdisciplinary medical caregiving approach aimed at optimizing quality of life and mitigating suffering among people with serious, complex illness. Within the published literature, many definitions of palliative care exist; most notably, the World Health Organization describes palliative care as "an approach that improves the quality of life of patients and their families facing the problems associated with life-threatening illness, through the prevention and relief of suffering by means of early identification and impeccable assessment and treatment of pain and other problems, physical, psychosocial, and spiritual." In the past, palliative care was a disease specific approach, but today the World Health Organization takes a more broad approach, that the principles of palliative care should be applied as early as possible to any chronic and ultimately fatal illness.
- Palpation – is the process of using one's hands to check the body, especially while perceiving/diagnosing a disease or illness.
- Pancreas – is an organ of the digestive system and endocrine system of vertebrates. In humans, it is located in the abdomen behind the stomach and functions as a gland. The pancreas has both an endocrine and a digestive exocrine function. As an endocrine gland, it functions mostly to regulate blood sugar levels, secreting the hormones insulin, glucagon, somatostatin, and pancreatic polypeptide. As a part of the digestive system, it functions as an exocrine gland secreting pancreatic juice into the duodenum through the pancreatic duct. This juice contains bicarbonate, which neutralizes acid entering the duodenum from the stomach; and digestive enzymes, which break down carbohydrates, proteins, and fats in food entering the duodenum from the stomach.
- Papillary - In oncology, papillary refers to neoplasms with projections ("papillae", from Latin, 'nipple') that have fibrovascular cores.
- Parasitology – is the study of parasites, their hosts, and the relationship between them. As a biological discipline, the scope of parasitology is not determined by the organism or environment in question but by their way of life. This means it forms a synthesis of other disciplines, and draws on techniques from fields such as cell biology, bioinformatics, biochemistry, molecular biology, immunology, genetics, evolution and ecology.
- Parathyroid glands – are small endocrine glands in the neck of humans and other tetrapods. Humans usually have four parathyroid glands, located on the back of the thyroid gland in variable locations. The parathyroid gland produces and secretes parathyroid hormone in response to a low blood calcium, which plays a key role in regulating the amount of calcium in the blood and within the bones.
- Parkinson's disease –
- Patella –
- Pathology –
- Pectineus muscle –
- Pectoralis major muscle –
- Pectoralis minor muscle –
- Pediatrics –
- Pelvis –
- Penis –
- Percussion (medicine) –
- Peripheral nervous system –
- Peripheral vision –
- Phalanx bone –
- Pharmacology –
- Pharynx –
- Physician –
- Physical examination –
- Physiology –
- Pineal gland –
- Pituitary gland –
- Placenta –
- Plastic surgery –
- Plexus – A branching network of vessels or nerves.
- Pons –
- Posterior tibial artery –
- Preventive healthcare –
- Prognosis –
- Prostate –
- Psychiatry –
- Pubis –
- Pulmonary artery –
- Pulmonary circulation –
- Pulmonary vein –
- Pulmonology –
- Pulse –

== Q ==
- Quadriplegia – Tetraplegia, also known as quadriplegia, is paralysis caused by illness or injury that results in the partial or total loss of use of all four limbs and torso; paraplegia is similar but does not affect the arms. The loss is usually sensory and motor, which means that both sensation and control are lost. The paralysis may be flaccid or spastic.

== R ==
- Radial artery – In human anatomy, the radial artery is the main artery of the lateral aspect of the forearm.
- Radial nerve – is a nerve in the human body that supplies the posterior portion of the upper limb. It innervates the medial and lateral heads of the triceps brachii muscle of the arm, as well as all 12 muscles in the posterior osteofascial compartment of the forearm and the associated joints and overlying skin. It originates from the brachial plexus, carrying fibers from the ventral roots of spinal nerves C5, C6, C7, C8 & T1.
- Radiology – is the medical discipline that uses medical imaging to diagnose and treat diseases within the body.
- Radius – The radius, or radial bone, is one of the two large bones of the forearm, the other being the ulna. It extends from the lateral side of the elbow to the thumb side of the wrist and runs parallel to the ulna. The ulna is usually slightly longer than the radius, but the radius is thicker. Therefore, the radius is considered to be the larger of the two. It is a long bone, prism-shaped and slightly curved longitudinally.
- Rectum – is the final straight portion of the large intestine in humans and some other mammals, and the gut in others. The adult human rectum is about 12 centimetres (4.7 in) long, and begins at the rectosigmoid junction, the end of the sigmoid colon, at the level of the third sacral vertebra or the sacral promontory depending upon what definition is used. Its caliber is similar to that of the sigmoid colon at its commencement, but it is dilated near its termination, forming the rectal ampulla. It terminates at the level of the anorectal ring (the level of the puborectalis sling) or the dentate line, again depending upon which definition is used. In humans, the rectum is followed by the anal canal which is about 4 centimetres (1.6 in) long, before the gastrointestinal tract terminates at the anal verge. The word rectum comes from the Latin rectum intestinum, meaning straight intestine.
- Rectus abdominis muscle – also known as the abdominal muscle, is a paired muscle running vertically on each side of the anterior wall of the human abdomen, as well as that of some other mammals. There are two parallel muscles, separated by a midline band of connective tissue called the linea alba. It extends from the pubic symphysis, pubic crest and pubic tubercle inferiorly, to the xiphoid process and costal cartilages of ribs V to VII superiorly. The proximal attachments are the pubic crest and the pubic symphysis. It attaches distally at the costal cartilages of ribs 5-7 and the xiphoid process of the sternum.
- Rectus femoris muscle – is one of the four quadriceps muscles of the human body. The others are the vastus medialis, the vastus intermedius (deep to the rectus femoris), and the vastus lateralis. All four parts of the quadriceps muscle attach to the patella (knee cap) by the quadriceps tendon. The rectus femoris is situated in the middle of the front of the thigh; it is fusiform in shape, and its superficial fibers are arranged in a bipenniform manner, the deep fibers running straight (Latin: rectus) down to the deep aponeurosis. Its functions are to flex the thigh at the hip joint and to extend the leg at the knee joint.
- Red blood cell – The most common type of blood cell and the vertebrate's principal means of delivering oxygen to the body tissues — via blood flow through the circulatory system. Red blood cells take up oxygen in the lungs and release it into tissues while squeezing through the body's capillaries.
- Renal artery – Paired arteries that supply the kidneys with blood.
- Renal vein –
- Reproductive system –
- Residency (medicine) –
- Respiratory system –
- Rheumatology –
- Rib cage –
- Ring finger –

== S ==
- Sacrum – The sacrum (plural: sacra or sacrums), in human anatomy, is a large, triangular bone at the base of the spine that forms by the fusing of sacral vertebrae S1–S5 between 18 and 30 years of age.
- Salivary gland – The salivary glands in mammals are exocrine glands that produce saliva through a system of ducts. Humans have three paired major salivary glands (parotid, submandibular, and sublingual), a pair of seromucous tubarial glands (discovered in 2020) as well as hundreds of minor salivary glands. Salivary glands can be classified as serous, mucous or seromucous (mixed).
- Saphenous nerve – (long or internal saphenous nerve) is the largest cutaneous branch of the femoral nerve. It is a strictly sensory nerve, and has no motor function.
- Saphenous vein, great – A large, subcutaneous, superficial vein of the leg. It is the longest vein in the body,
- Saphenous vein, small – A relatively large superficial vein of the posterior leg.
- Sartorius muscle –
- Scalp –
- Scapula –
- Sciatic nerve –
- Scrotum –
- Sebaceous gland –
- Seminal vesicle –
- Sensory nervous system –
- Sensory processing –
- Serratus anterior muscle –
- Serratus posterior inferior muscle –
- Serratus posterior superior muscle –
- Skeletal muscle –
- Skin –
- Skull –
- Small intestine –
- Small saphenous vein –
- Smooth muscle tissue –
- Special senses –
- Specialty (medicine) –
- Spinal cord –
- Spinal nerve –
- Sole –
- Soleus muscle –
- Spleen –
- Sports medicine –
- Sternohyoid muscle –
- Sternum –
- Stomach –
- Striated muscle tissue –
- Subclavian artery –
- Subcutaneous tissue –
- Superficial temporal artery –
- Superior oblique muscle –
- Superior thyroid artery –
- Superior vena cava –
- Surgery –
- Sweat gland –
- Symptom –
- Synovial bursa –
- Synovial joint –
- Synovial membrane –
- Systemic lupus erythematosus –
- Systems biology –

== T ==
- Tarsus – In the human body, the tarsus is a cluster of seven articulating bones in each foot situated between the lower end of the tibia and the fibula of the lower leg and the metatarsus. It is made up of the midfoot (cuboid, medial, intermediate, and lateral cuneiform, and navicular) and hindfoot (talus and calcaneus).
- Taste – The gustatory system or sense of taste is the sensory system that is partially responsible for the perception of taste (flavor). Taste is the perception produced or stimulated when a substance in the mouth reacts chemically with taste receptor cells located on taste buds in the oral cavity, mostly on the tongue. Taste, along with smell (olfaction) and trigeminal nerve stimulation (registering texture, pain, and temperature), determines flavors of food and other substances. Humans have taste receptors on taste buds and other areas including the upper surface of the tongue and the epiglottis. The gustatory cortex is responsible for the perception of taste.
- Teeth –
- Temple –
- Temporal arteries, deep –
- Temporal artery, middle –
- Temporal artery, superficial –
- Temporal muscle –
- Tendon –
- Tensor fasciae latae muscle –
- Testicle –
- Thigh –
- Thoracic diaphragm –
- Thorax –
- Throat –
- Thumb –
- Thymus –
- Thyroid –
- Thyroid artery, inferior –
- Thyroid artery, superior –
- Thyroid ima artery –
- Tibia –
- Tibialis anterior muscle –
- Tibialis posterior muscle –
- Tissue –
- Toe –
- Toll-like receptor –
- Tongue –
- Toxicology –
- Trachea –
- Trapezius muscle –
- Triceps brachii muscle –

== U ==
- Ulna – is a long bone found in the forearm that stretches from the elbow to the smallest finger, and when in anatomical position, is found on the medial side of the forearm. It runs parallel to the radius, the other long bone in the forearm. The ulna is usually slightly longer than the radius, but the radius is thicker. Therefore, the radius is considered to be the larger of the two.
- Ulnar artery – is the main blood vessel, with oxygenated blood, of the medial aspects of the forearm. It arises from the brachial artery and terminates in the superficial palmar arch, which joins with the superficial branch of the radial artery. It is palpable on the anterior and medial aspect of the wrist.
- Ulnar nerve – In human anatomy, the ulnar nerve is a nerve that runs near the ulna bone. The ulnar collateral ligament of elbow joint is in relation with the ulnar nerve. The nerve is the largest in the human body unprotected by muscle or bone, so injury is common. This nerve is directly connected to the little finger, and the adjacent half of the ring finger, innervating the palmar aspect of these fingers, including both front and back of the tips, perhaps as far back as the fingernail beds.
- Ureter – The ureters are tubes made of smooth muscle that propel urine from the kidneys to the urinary bladder. In the human adult, the ureters are usually 20–30 cm (8–12 in) long and around 3–4 mm (0.12–0.16 in) in diameter. The ureter is lined by urothelial cells, a type of transitional epithelium, and has an additional smooth muscle layer in third closest to the bladder that assists with peristalsis.
- Urethra – The urethra is a tube that connects the urinary bladder to the urinary meatus for the removal of urine from the body of both females and males. In human females and other primates, the urethra connects to the urinary meatus above the vagina, whereas in marsupials, the female's urethra empties into the urogenital sinus. Females use their urethra only for urinating, but males use their urethra for both urination and ejaculation. The external urethral sphincter is a striated muscle that allows voluntary control over urination. The internal sphincter, formed by the involuntary smooth muscles lining the bladder neck and urethra, receives its nerve supply by the sympathetic division of the autonomic nervous system. The internal sphincter is present both in males and females.
- Urinary bladder – The urinary bladder, or simply bladder, is a hollow muscular organ in humans and other vertebrates that stores urine from the kidneys before disposal by urination. In the human the bladder is a hollow muscular, and distensible organ that sits on the pelvic floor. Urine enters the bladder via the ureters and exits via the urethra. The typical human bladder will hold between 300 and 500 ml (10.14 and 16.91 fl oz) before the urge to empty occurs, but can hold considerably more.
- Urinary system – The urinary system, also known as the renal system or urinary tract, consists of the kidneys, ureters, bladder, and the urethra. The purpose of the urinary system is to eliminate waste from the body, regulate blood volume and blood pressure, control levels of electrolytes and metabolites, and regulate blood pH. The urinary tract is the body's drainage system for the eventual removal of urine. The kidneys have an extensive blood supply via the renal arteries which leave the kidneys via the renal vein. Each kidney consists of functional units called nephrons. Following filtration of blood and further processing, wastes (in the form of urine) exit the kidney via the ureters, tubes made of smooth muscle fibres that propel urine towards the urinary bladder, where it is stored and subsequently expelled from the body by urination (voiding). The female and male urinary system are very similar, differing only in the length of the urethra.
- Urology – also known as genitourinary surgery, is the branch of medicine that focuses on surgical and medical diseases of the male and female urinary-tract system and the male reproductive organs. Organs under the domain of urology include the kidneys, adrenal glands, ureters, urinary bladder, urethra, and the male reproductive organs (testes, epididymis, vas deferens, seminal vesicles, prostate, and penis).
- Uterus – The uterus or womb is a major female hormone-responsive secondary sex organ of the reproductive system in humans and most other mammals. In the human, the lower end of the uterus, the cervix, opens into the vagina, while the upper end, the fundus, is connected to the fallopian tubes. It is within the uterus that the fetus develops during gestation. In the human embryo, the uterus develops from the paramesonephric ducts which fuse into the single organ known as a simplex uterus. The uterus has different forms in many other animals and in some it exists as two separate uteri known as a duplex uterus.

== V ==
- Vaccine – is a biological preparation that provides active acquired immunity to a particular disease. A vaccine typically contains an agent that resembles a disease-causing microorganism and is often made from weakened or killed forms of the microbe, its toxins, or one of its surface proteins. The agent stimulates the body's immune system to recognize the agent as a threat, destroy it, and to further recognize and destroy any of the microorganisms associated with that agent that it may encounter in the future. Vaccines can be prophylactic (to prevent or ameliorate the effects of a future infection by a natural or "wild" pathogen), or therapeutic (e.g., vaccines against cancer, which are being investigated).
- Vagina – In mammals, the vagina is the elastic, muscular part of the female genital tract. In humans, it extends from the vulva to the cervix. The outer vaginal opening is normally partly covered by a membrane called the hymen. At the deep end, the cervix (neck of the uterus) bulges into the vagina. The vagina allows for sexual intercourse and birth. It also channels menstrual flow (menses), which occurs in humans and closely related primates as part of the monthly menstrual cycle.
- Vas deferens – also called ductus deferens, is part of the male reproductive system of many vertebrates; these ducts transport sperm from the epididymis to the ejaculatory ducts in anticipation of ejaculation. It is a partially coiled tube which exits the abdominal cavity through the inguinal canal.
- Vastus intermedius muscle – arises from the front and lateral surfaces of the body of the femur in its upper two-thirds, sitting under the rectus femoris muscle and from the lower part of the lateral intermuscular septum. Its fibers end in a superficial aponeurosis, which forms the deep part of the quadriceps femoris tendon.
- Vastus lateralis muscle –
- Vastus medialis –
- Vein –
- Vena cava, inferior –
- Vena cava, superior –
- Ventricle –
- Ventricle system –
- Venule –
- Vertebral column –
- Virology – is the study of viral – submicroscopic, parasitic particles of genetic material contained in a protein coat – and virus-like agents. It focuses on the following aspects of viruses: their structure, classification and evolution, their ways to infect and exploit host cells for reproduction, their interaction with host organism physiology and immunity, the diseases they cause, the techniques to isolate and culture them, and their use in research and therapy. Virology is considered to be a subfield of microbiology or of medicine.
- Visual acuity – (VA), commonly refers to the clarity of vision, but technically rates an examinee's ability to recognize small details with precision. Visual acuity is dependent on optical and neural factors, i.e., (1) the sharpness of the retinal image within the eye, (2) the health and functioning of the retina, and (3) the sensitivity of the interpretative faculty of the brain.
- Visual cortex – The visual cortex of the brain is the area of the cerebral cortex that processes visual information. It is located in the occipital lobe. Sensory input originating from the eyes travels through the lateral geniculate nucleus in the thalamus and then reaches the visual cortex. The area of the visual cortex that receives the sensory input from the lateral geniculate nucleus is the primary visual cortex, also known as visual area 1 (V1), Brodmann area 17, or the striate cortex. The extrastriate areas consist of visual areas 2, 3, 4, and 5 (also known as V2, V3, V4, and V5, or Brodmann area 18 and all Brodmann area 19).
- Visual field test – is an eye examination that can detect dysfunction in central and peripheral vision which may be caused by various medical conditions such as glaucoma, stroke, pituitary disease, brain tumours or other neurological deficits. Visual field testing can be performed clinically by keeping the subject's gaze fixed while presenting objects at various places within their visual field. Simple manual equipment can be used such as in the tangent screen test or the Amsler grid. When dedicated machinery is used it is called a perimeter.
- Visual perception – is the ability to interpret the surrounding environment using light in the visible spectrum reflected by the objects in the environment. This is different from visual acuity, which refers to how clearly a person sees (for example "20/20 vision"). A person can have problems with visual perceptual processing even if they have 20/20 vision.
- Vital signs – (also known as vitals) are a group of the four to six most important medical signs that indicate the status of the body's vital (life-sustaining) functions. These measurements are taken to help assess the general physical health of a person, give clues to possible diseases, and show progress toward recovery. The normal ranges for a person's vital signs vary with age, weight, gender, and overall health. There are four primary vital signs: body temperature, blood pressure, pulse (heart rate), and breathing rate (respiratory rate), often notated as BT, BP, HR, and RR. However, depending on the clinical setting, the vital signs may include other measurements called the "fifth vital sign" or "sixth vital sign". Vital signs are recorded using the LOINC internationally accepted standard coding system.
- Vitamin D – is a group of fat-soluble secosteroids responsible for increasing intestinal absorption of calcium, magnesium, and phosphate, and many other biological effects. In humans, the most important compounds in this group are vitamin D_{3} (also known as cholecalciferol) and vitamin D_{2} (ergocalciferol).
- Vitrectomy – is a surgery to remove some or all of the vitreous humor from the eye. Anterior vitrectomy entails removing small portions of the vitreous humor from the front structures of the eye—often because these are tangled in an intraocular lens or other structures. Pars plana vitrectomy is a general term for a group of operations accomplished in the deeper part of the eye, all of which involve removing some or all of the vitreous humor—the eye's clear internal jelly.
- Vitreous body –
- Vulva –

== W ==
- Waist – is the part of the abdomen between the rib cage and hips. On people with slim bodies, the waist is the narrowest part of the torso. The waistline refers to the horizontal line where the waist is narrowest, or to the general appearance of the waist.
- Wart – Warts are typically small, rough, hard growths that are similar in color to the rest of the skin. They typically do not result in other symptoms, except when on the bottom of the feet, where they may be painful. While they usually occur on the hands and feet, they can also affect other locations. One or many warts may appear. They are not cancerous.
- Weber test – is a screening test for hearing performed with a tuning fork. It can detect unilateral (one-sided) conductive hearing loss (middle ear hearing loss) and unilateral sensorineural hearing loss (inner ear hearing loss). The test is named after Ernst Heinrich Weber (1795–1878). Conductive hearing ability is mediated by the middle ear composed of the ossicles: the malleus, the incus, and the stapes. Sensorineural hearing ability is mediated by the inner ear composed of the cochlea with its internal basilar membrane and attached cochlear nerve (cranial nerve VIII). The outer ear consisting of the pinna, ear canal, and ear drum or tympanic membrane transmits sounds to the middle ear but does not contribute to the conduction or sensorineural hearing ability save for hearing transmissions limited by cerumen impaction (wax collection in the ear canal). The Weber test has had its value as a screening test questioned in the literature.
- Wernicke–Korsakoff syndrome – (WKS) is the combined presence of Wernicke encephalopathy (WE) and alcoholic Korsakoff syndrome. Due to the close relationship between these two disorders, people with either are usually diagnosed with WKS as a single syndrome. It mainly causes vision changes, ataxia and impaired memory.
- Wernicke's area – also called Wernicke's speech area, is one of the two parts of the cerebral cortex that are linked to speech, the other being Broca's area. It is involved in the comprehension of written and spoken language, in contrast to Broca's area, which is involved in the production of language. It is traditionally thought to reside in Brodmann area 22, which is located in the superior temporal gyrus in the dominant cerebral hemisphere, which is the left hemisphere in about 95% of right-handed individuals and 60% of left-handed individuals.
- Whiplash – is a non-medical term describing a range of injuries to the neck caused by or related to a sudden distortion of the neck associated with extension, although the exact injury mechanisms remain unknown. The term "whiplash" is a colloquialism. "Cervical acceleration–deceleration" (CAD) describes the mechanism of the injury, while the term "whiplash associated disorders" (WAD) describes the injury sequelae and symptoms.
- White blood cell – White blood cells (WBCs), also called leukocytes or leucocytes, are the cells of the immune system that are involved in protecting the body against both infectious disease and foreign invaders. All white blood cells are produced and derived from multipotent cells in the bone marrow known as hematopoietic stem cells. Leukocytes are found throughout the body, including the blood and lymphatic system.
- White matter – refers to areas of the central nervous system (CNS) that are mainly made up of myelinated axons, also called tracts. Long thought to be passive tissue, white matter affects learning and brain functions, modulating the distribution of action potentials, acting as a relay and coordinating communication between different brain regions.
- Working memory – is a cognitive system with a limited capacity that can hold information temporarily. Working memory is important for reasoning and the guidance of decision-making and behavior. Working memory is often used synonymously with short-term memory, but some theorists consider the two forms of memory distinct, assuming that working memory allows for the manipulation of stored information, whereas short-term memory only refers to the short-term storage of information. Working memory is a theoretical concept central to cognitive psychology, neuropsychology, and neuroscience.
- Wrist – In human anatomy, the wrist is variously defined as 1) the carpus or carpal bones, the complex of eight bones forming the proximal skeletal segment of the hand; (2) the wrist joint or radiocarpal joint, the joint between the radius and the carpus and; (3) the anatomical region surrounding the carpus including the distal parts of the bones of the forearm and the proximal parts of the metacarpus or five metacarpal bones and the series of joints between these bones, thus referred to as wrist joints. This region also includes the carpal tunnel, the anatomical snuff box, bracelet lines, the flexor retinaculum, and the extensor retinaculum. As a consequence of these various definitions, fractures to the carpal bones are referred to as carpal fractures, while fractures such as distal radius fracture are often considered fractures to the wrist.

== X ==
- Xanthoma – A xanthoma (pl. xanthomas or xanthomata) (condition: xanthomatosis), from Greek ξανθός (xanthós) 'yellow', is a deposition of yellowish cholesterol-rich material that can appear anywhere in the body in various disease states. They are cutaneous manifestations of lipidosis in which lipids accumulate in large foam cells within the skin. They are associated with hyperlipidemias, both primary and secondary types.

== Y ==
- Yaws – is a tropical infection of the skin, bones and joints caused by the spirochete bacterium Treponema pallidum pertenue. The disease begins with a round, hard swelling of the skin, 2 to 5 centimeters in diameter. The center may break open and form an ulcer. This initial skin lesion typically heals after three to six months. After weeks to years, joints and bones may become painful, fatigue may develop, and new skin lesions may appear. The skin of the palms of the hands and the soles of the feet may become thick and break open. The bones (especially those of the nose) may become misshapen. After five years or more large areas of skin may die, leaving a scar.
- Yellow fever – is a viral disease of typically short duration. In most cases, symptoms include fever, chills, loss of appetite, nausea, muscle pains particularly in the back, and headaches. Symptoms typically improve within five days. In about 15% of people, within a day of improving the fever comes back, abdominal pain occurs, and liver damage begins causing yellow skin. If this occurs, the risk of bleeding and kidney problems is increased.

== Z ==
- Zellweger spectrum disorders – are a group of rare disorders that create the same disease process. The subdivisions of this spectrum are hyperpipecolic acidemia, Infantile Refsum disease, neonatal adrenoleukodystrophy (NALD), and Zellweger syndrome. It can also be referred to as Peroxisomal Biogenesis Disorders, Zellweger Syndrome Spectrum, NALD, Cerebrohepatorenal Syndrome, and ZSS. It can affect many body organs, including the kidneys, eyes, and hearing. It is named after Hans Zellweger.
- Zika virus – (ZIKV) (pronounced /ˈziːkə/ or /ˈzɪkə/) is a member of the virus family Flaviviridae. It is spread by daytime-active Aedes mosquitoes, such as A. aegypti and A. albopictus. Its name comes from the Ziika Forest of Uganda, where the virus was first isolated in 1947. Zika virus shares a genus with the dengue, yellow fever, Japanese encephalitis, and West Nile viruses. Since the 1950s, it has been known to occur within a narrow equatorial belt from Africa to Asia. From 2007 to 2016, the virus spread eastward, across the Pacific Ocean to the Americas, leading to the 2015–2016 Zika virus epidemic.
- Zoonosis – A zoonosis (plural zoonoses, or zoonotic diseases) is an infectious disease caused by a pathogen (an infectious agent, such as a bacterium, virus, parasite or prion) that has jumped from a non-human animal (usually a vertebrate) to a human. Typically, the first infected human transmits the infectious agent to at least one other human, who, in turn, infects others.
- Zygomatic bone – In the human skull, the zygomatic bone (cheekbone or malar bone) is a paired irregular bone which articulates with the maxilla, the temporal bone, the sphenoid bone and the frontal bone. It is situated at the upper and lateral part of the face and forms the prominence of the cheek, part of the lateral wall and floor of the orbit, and parts of the temporal fossa and the infratemporal fossa. It presents a malar and a temporal surface; four processes (the frontosphenoidal, orbital, maxillary, and temporal), and four borders.
- Zonular dialysis – Deficient support of the lenticular capsule of the eye by the Zonules of Zinn.

== See also ==
- List of medical roots, suffixes and prefixes
- List of bones of the human skeleton
- List of nerves of the human body
- List of skeletal muscles of the human body
- Anatomical terms of location
- Anatomical terminology
- List of diseases
- Medical College Admission Test
