= Chondro-4-sulfatase =

Class of enzymes

Identifiers
- EC no.: 3.1.6.9
- CAS no.: 9045-75-4

Databases
- BRENDA: enzyme data
- ExPASy: NiceZyme view
- KEGG: enzyme entry
- MetaCyc: metabolic pathway
- Rhea: reactions
- PDB structures: RCSB PDB PDBe PDBsum
Search
- PMC: articles
- PubMed: articles
- NCBI: proteins

The enzyme chondro-4-sulfatase (EC 3.1.6.9) catalyzes the reaction

(1)
H_{2}O
H_{2}SO_{4}
(2)

The enzyme characterised from bovine aorta and Proteus vulgaris hydrolyses 4-deoxy-β-D-gluc-4-enuronosyl-(1→3)-N-acetyl-D-galactosamine 4-sulfate (1) to 4-deoxy-β-D-gluc-4-enuronosyl-(1→3)-N-acetyl-D-galactosamine (2) and sulfate. The reaction is part of the breakdown pathway for chondroitins.

This enzyme belongs to the family of hydrolases, specifically those acting on sulfuric ester bonds. The systematic name is 4-deoxy-β-D-gluc-4-enuronosyl-(1→3)-N-acetyl-D-galactosamine-4-sulfate 4-sulfohydrolase. This enzyme is also called chondroitin-4-sulfatase.
