= Chondro-6-sulfatase =

Class of enzymes

Identifiers
- EC no.: 3.1.6.10
- CAS no.: 9045-76-5

Databases
- BRENDA: enzyme data
- ExPASy: NiceZyme view
- KEGG: enzyme entry
- MetaCyc: metabolic pathway
- Rhea: reactions
- PDB structures: RCSB PDB PDBe PDBsum
Search
- PMC: articles
- PubMed: articles
- NCBI: proteins

The enzyme chondro-6-sulfatase (EC 3.1.6.10) catalyzes the reaction

(1)
H_{2}O
H_{2}SO_{4}
(2)

The enzyme characterised from Proteus vulgaris hydrolyses 4-deoxy-β-D-gluc-4-enuronosyl-(1→3)-N-acetyl-D-galactosamine 6-sulfate (1) to 4-deoxy-β-D-gluc-4-enuronosyl-(1→3)-N-acetyl-D-galactosamine (2) and sulfate. The reaction is part of the breakdown pathway for chondroitins.

This enzyme is a hydrolase, specifically one acting on sulfuric ester bonds. The systematic name is 4-deoxy-β-D-gluc-4-enuronosyl-(1→3)-N-acetyl-D-galactosamine-6-sulfate 6-sulfohydrolase.
