= Superficial venous palmar arch =

Superficial palmar venous arch
- Palm of left hand, showing position of skin creases and bones, and surface markings for the volar arches. (Superficial palmar venous arch not visible, but diagram shows location of corresponding artery.)

Details
- Source: Common palmar digital veins
- Drains to: Ulnar vein
- Artery: Superficial palmar arch

Identifiers
- Latin: arcus venosus palmaris superficialis
- TA98: A12.3.08.026
- TA2: 4986
- FMA: 22914

The superficial palmar venous arch consists of a pair of venae comitantes accompanying the superficial palmar arch. It receives the common palmar digital veins (the veins corresponding to the branches of the superficial arterial arch). It drains into the superficial ulnar radial and superficial radial veins, and the median antebrachial vein.
