= Glucuronate-2-sulfatase =

glucuronate-2-sulfatase

Identifiers
- EC no.: 3.1.6.18
- CAS no.: 98597-45-6

Databases
- IntEnz: IntEnz view
- BRENDA: BRENDA entry
- ExPASy: NiceZyme view
- KEGG: KEGG entry
- MetaCyc: metabolic pathway
- PRIAM: profile
- PDB structures: RCSB PDB PDBe PDBsum
- Gene Ontology: AmiGO / QuickGO
Search
- PMC: articles
- PubMed: articles
- NCBI: proteins

In enzymology, a glucuronate-2-sulfatase (EC 3.1.6.18) is an enzyme that catalyzes the chemical reaction of cleaving off the 2-sulfate groups of the 2-O-sulfo-D-glucuronate residues of chondroitin sulfate, heparin and heparitin sulfate.

This enzyme belongs to the family of hydrolases, specifically those acting on sulfuric ester bonds. The systematic name of this enzyme class is polysaccharide-2-O-sulfo-D-glucuronate 2-sulfohydrolase. This enzyme is also called glucurono-2-sulfatase. This enzyme participates in glycosaminoglycan degradation and glycan structures - degradation.
