= Atonic =

Atonic may refer to:

In music:

- Atonality, lack of a key or tonal center

In medicine:

- Atony, a muscle losing its strength

In linguistics:

- Atonic or unaccented, a syllable without stress or pitch accent
