= Radial veins =

Large blood vessels of the forearm

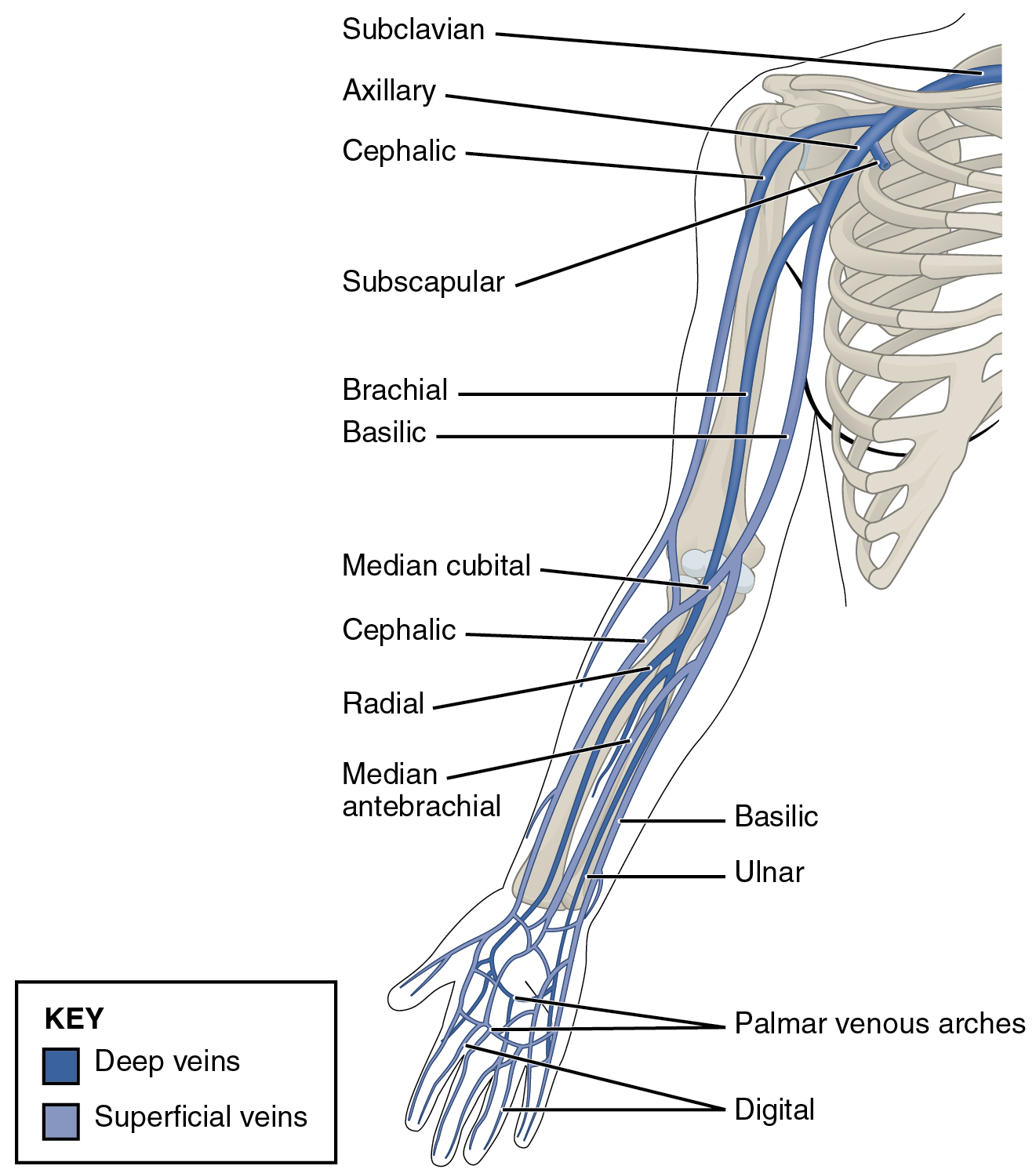
- Veins of the upper limb

Details
- Source: Deep palmar venous arch
- Drains to: Brachial veins
- Artery: Radial artery

Identifiers
- Latin: venae radiales
- TA98: A12.3.08.031
- TA2: 4988
- FMA: 70898

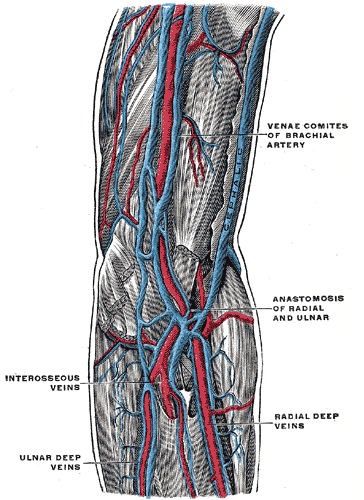
The deep veins of the upper extremity. (Radial deep veins labeled at bottom right.)

In anatomy, the radial veins are paired veins that accompany the radial artery through the back of the hand and the lateral aspect of the forearm. They join the ulnar veins to form the brachial veins.

They follow the same course as the radial artery.
