= Chondrin =

Geleatin-like substance derived from cartilage

Chondrin is a bluish-white gelatin-like substance, being a protein-carbohydrate complex and can be obtained by boiling cartilage in water. The cartilage is a connective tissue that contains cells embedded in a matrix of chondrin. Chondrin is made up of two proteins chondroalbunoid and chondromucoid.

== See also ==
- Chondroitin
