= Ulnar veins =

Large blood vessels of the forearm

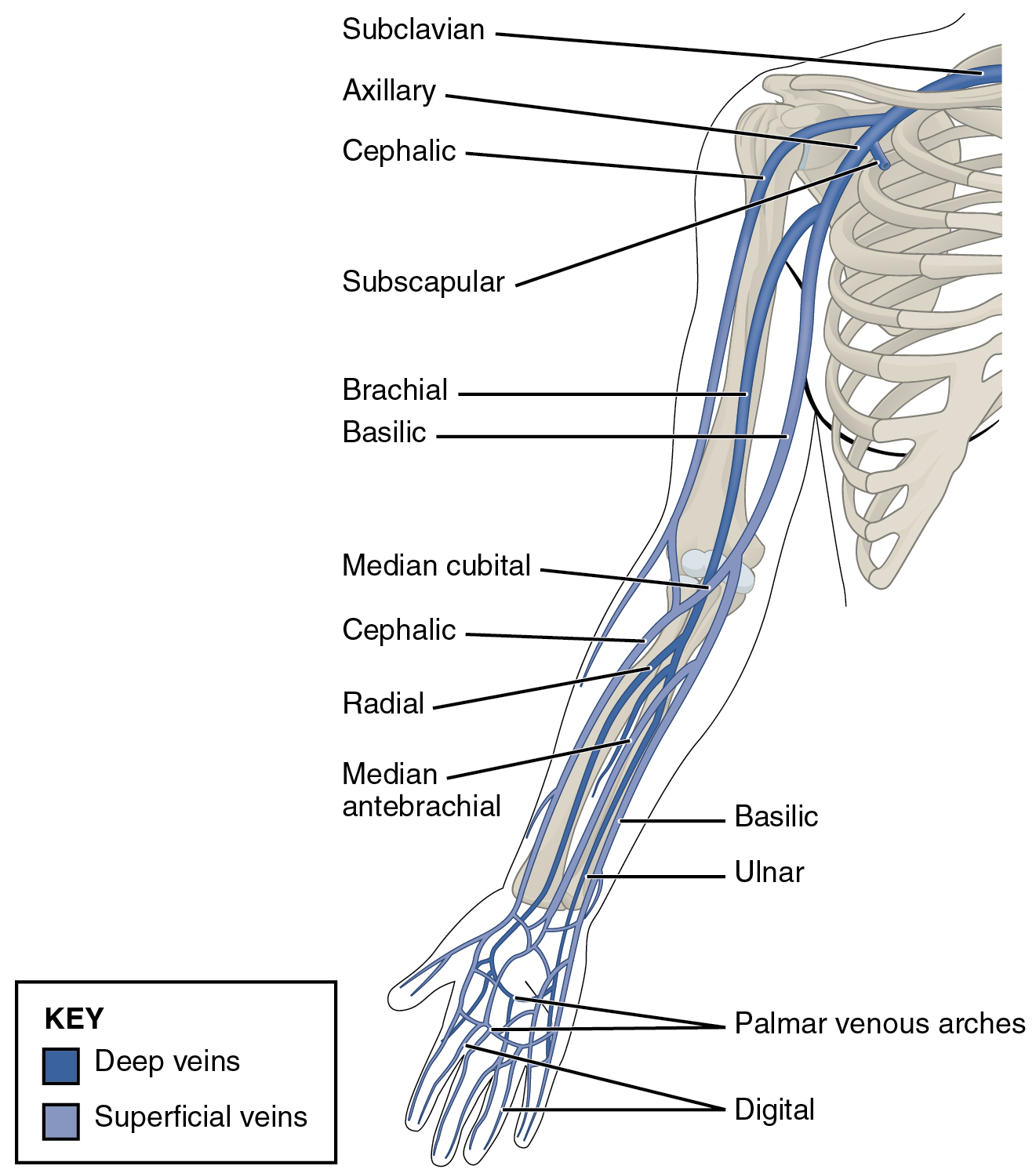
- Veins of the upper limb

Details
- Source: Superficial palmar venous arch
- Drains to: Brachial vein
- Artery: Ulnar artery

Identifiers
- Latin: vena ulnaris (plural: venae ulnares)
- TA98: A12.3.08.030
- TA2: 4985
- FMA: 70897

The ulnar veins are venae comitantes of the ulnar artery. They drain the superficial venous palmar arch. They arise in the hand and terminate by uniting with the radial veins to form the brachial veins. They mostly drain the medial aspect of the forearm. They receive the venae comitantes of the anterior and posterior interosseous arteries near the elbow, as well as a large branch from the median cubital vein. The ulnar veins are larger than the radial veins.

They follow the same course as the ulnar artery.

== Additional images ==
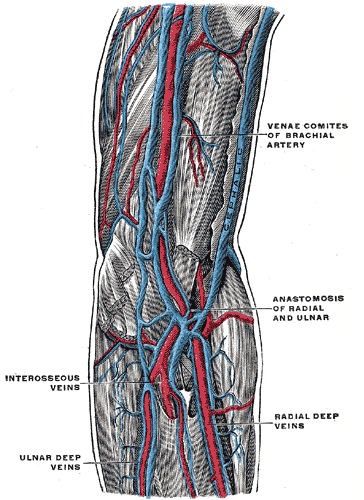
The deep veins of the upper extremity.

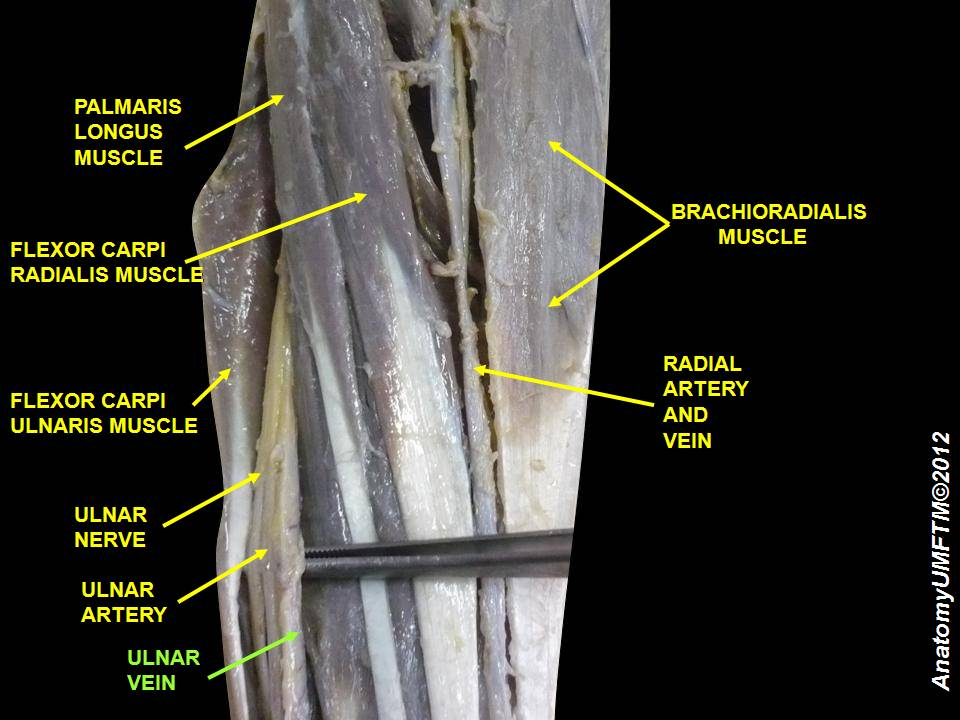
Ulnar veins

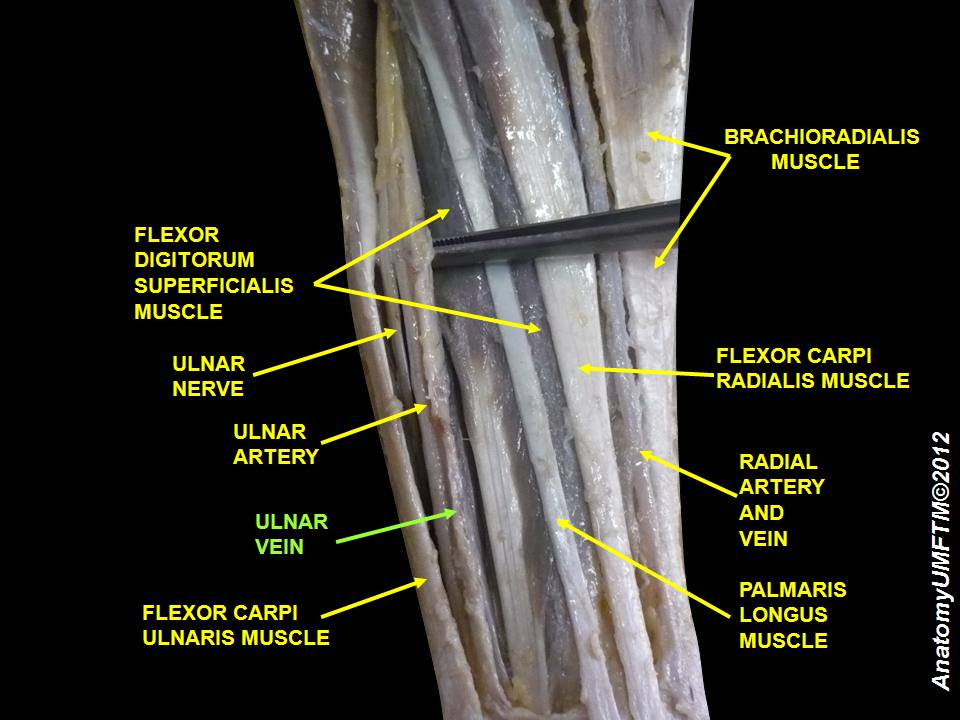
Ulnar vein
