= Brachial veins =

Large blood vessels of the arms

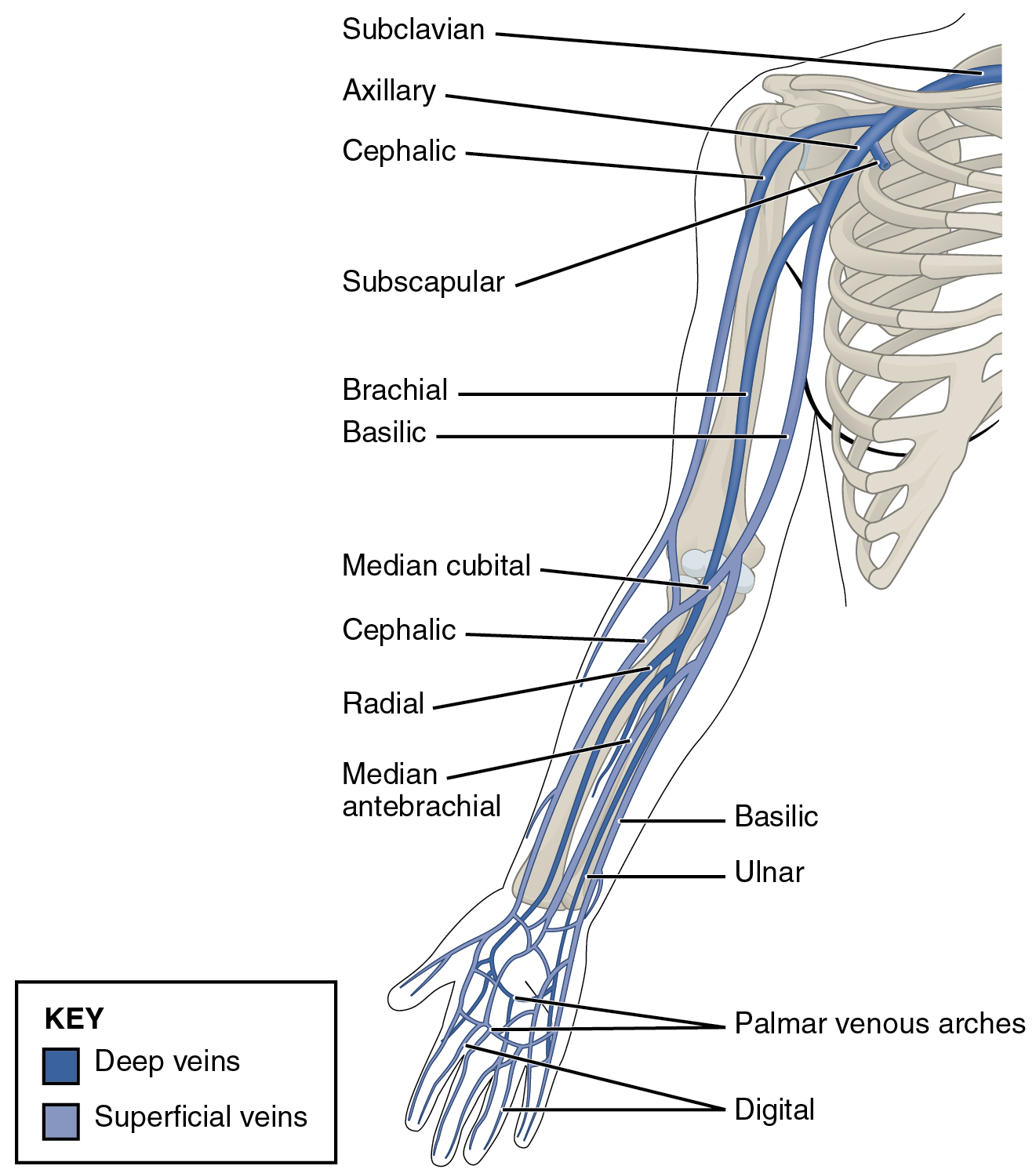
- Veins of the upper limb

Details
- Source: Radial veins, ulnar veins
- Drains to: Axillary vein
- Artery: Brachial artery

Identifiers
- Latin: venae brachiales
- TA98: A12.3.08.029
- TA2: 4982
- FMA: 22934

In human anatomy, the brachial veins are venae comitantes of the brachial artery in the arm proper. Because they are deep to muscle, they are considered deep veins. Their course is that of the brachial artery (in reverse): they begin where radial veins and ulnar veins join (corresponding to the bifurcation of the brachial artery). They end at the inferior border of the teres major muscle. At this point, the brachial veins join the basilic vein to form the axillary vein.

The brachial veins also have small tributaries that drain the muscles of the upper arm, such as biceps brachii muscle and triceps brachii muscle.

== Additional images ==
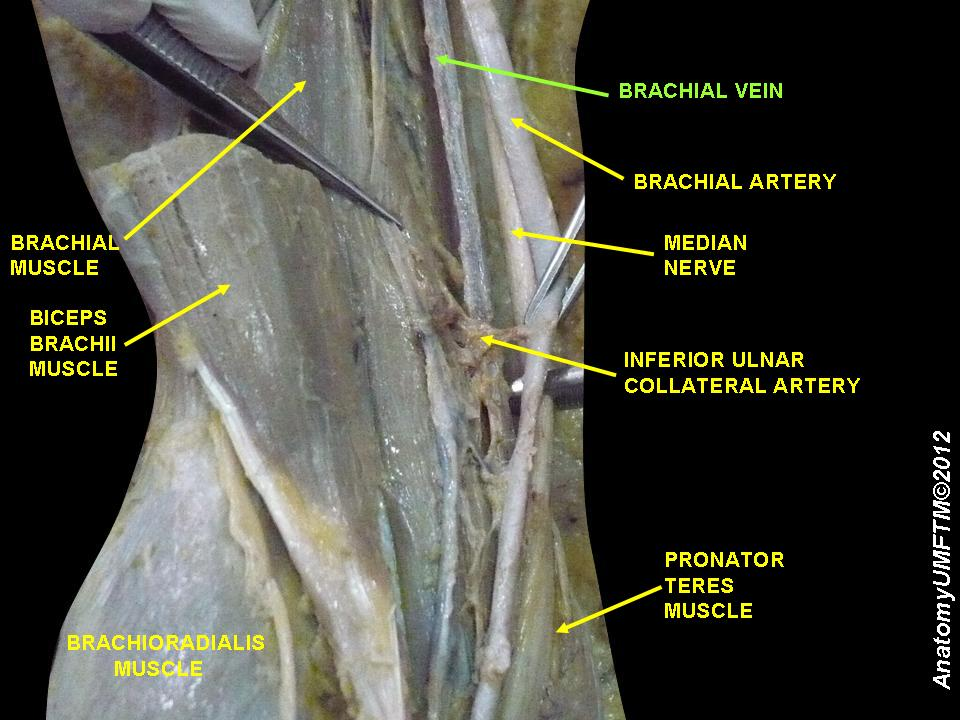
Brachial vein

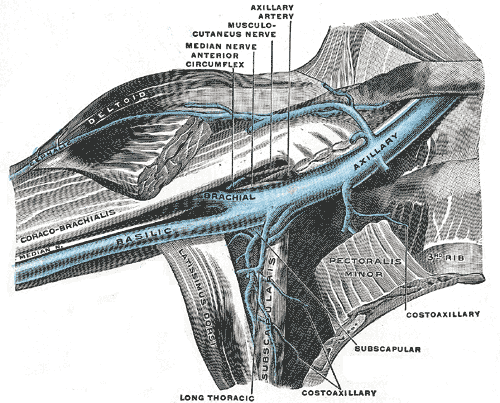
The veins of the right axilla, viewed from in front.
