= Vena comitans =

Paired veins accompanying an artery

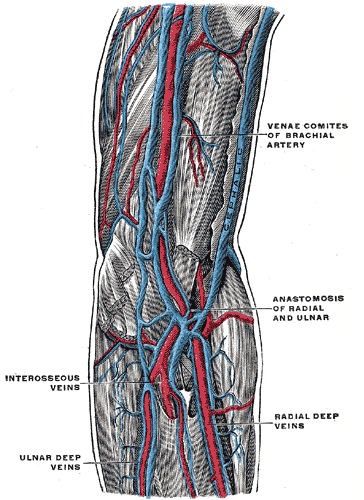
- The deep veins of the arm. (Venae comitantes labeled as venae comites at upper left.)

Identifiers
- TA98: A12.0.00.031
- TA2: 3905
- FMA: 76841

Vena comitans (Latin for accompanying vein, also known as a satellite vein) refers to a vein that is usually paired, with both veins lying on the sides of an artery. Because they are generally found in pairs, they are often referred to by their plural form: venae comitantes.

Venae comitantes are usually found with certain smaller arteries, especially those in the extremities. Larger arteries, on the other hand, generally do not have venae comitantes. They usually have a single, similarly sized vein which is not as intimately associated with the artery.

== Function ==
As the vein is found in close proximity to an artery the pulsations of the artery aid venous return. Claude Bernard suggested the interchange of heat between the arteries and adjacent veins might moderate cooling of the arterial blood, for which there is experimental evidence.

== Examples ==
Examples of arteries and their venae comitantes:

- Radial artery and radial veins
- Ulnar artery and ulnar veins
- Brachial artery and brachial veins
- Anterior tibial artery and anterior tibial veins
- Posterior tibial artery and posterior tibial veins
- Fibular artery and fibular veins

Examples of arteries that do not have venae comitantes (i.e. those that have "regular" veins):

- Axillary artery and the axillary vein
- Subclavian artery and the subclavian vein
