= Chondroitin =

Chemical derivative of chondrin

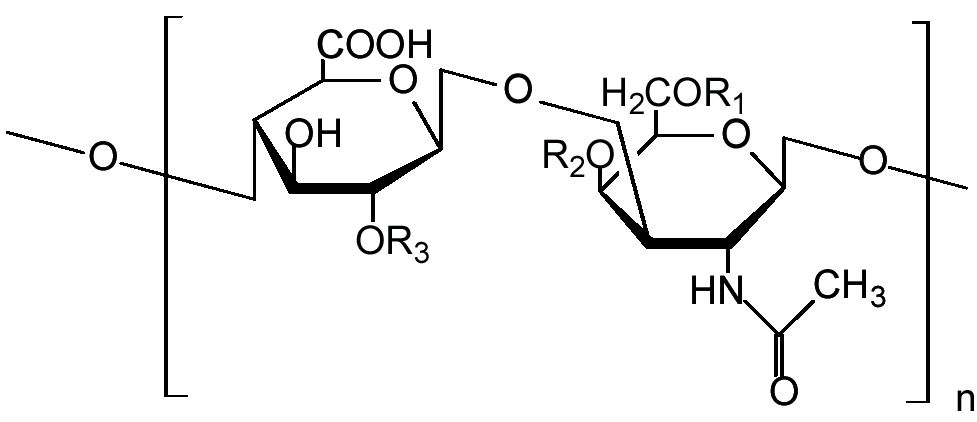
Structure of one disaccharide unit of chondroitin sulfate

A chondroitin, as the sulfate, is a component of bamacan, a proteoglycan (sugar-protein conjugate) that comprises some membranes. Chondroitin is a chondrin derivative.

Types include:

- Chondroitin sulfate
- Dermatan sulfate

Chondroitin as a supplement is now commonly used (often in combination with glucosamine) in treating the joint disease of osteoarthritis. In contrast to the symptomatic treatments, chondroitin can modify the progression of a disease process in the patient which it can be used as an alternative medicine. Chondroitin's effect toward the articular cartilage integrity as it is part of the proteoglycan molecules. The cartilage proteoglycan synthesis can speed up as chondroitin is going through the pathway of the alimentary canal. Research has been conducted to show the effectiveness of chondroitin and results indicate that it helps to manage pain in knee and hip, slow down the progression and also recovery. However, the effectiveness of the drugs is still doubtful.
