= Metatarsal artery =

Metatarsal artery may refer to

- Dorsal metatarsal arteries
  - First dorsal metatarsal artery
- Plantar metatarsal arteries
