= Anterior tibial =

Anterior tibial may refer to:

- Anterior tibial artery
- Anterior tibial vein
- Anterior tibial recurrent artery
- Saber shin also known from anterior tibial bowing
- Tibialis anterior muscle also known as anterior tibialis

== See also ==
- Posterior tibial (disambiguation)
