= Lateral tarsal artery =

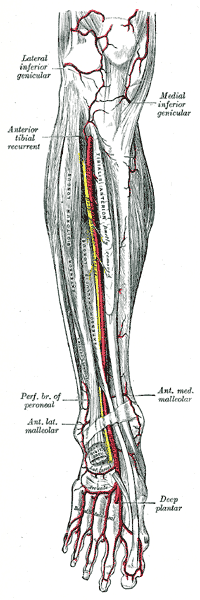
- Anterior tibial artery, dorsalis pedis artery and the muscles and bones of the leg - anterior view. (Lat. tarsal very faintly labeled at bottom center.)

Details
- Source: Dorsalis pedis artery

Identifiers
- Latin: arteria tarsalis lateralis
- TA98: A12.2.16.049
- TA2: 4715
- FMA: 44595

The lateral tarsal artery (tarsal artery) arises from the dorsalis pedis, as that vessel crosses the navicular bone; it passes in an arched direction lateralward, lying upon the tarsal bones, and covered by extensor hallucis brevis and extensor digitorum brevis; it supplies these muscles and the articulations of the tarsus, and receives the arcuate over the base of the fifth metatarsal. It may receive contributions from branches of the anterior lateral malleolar and the perforating branch of the peroneal artery directed towards the joint capsule, and from the lateral plantar arteries through perforating arteries of the foot.
