= Tibial vein =

Tibial vein may refer to:

- Anterior tibial vein
- Posterior tibial vein
