= Common digital veins =

Details

Identifiers
- Latin: venae digitales communes pedis

On the dorsum of the foot the dorsal digital veins receive, in the clefts between the toes, the intercapitular veins from the plantar venous arch and join to form short common digital veins which unite across the distal ends of the metatarsal bones in a dorsal venous arch.
