= Metatarsal veins =

Metatarsal veins may refer to:

- Dorsal metatarsal veins
- Plantar metatarsal veins
