= Plantar artery =

Plantar artery may refer to

- Common plantar digital arteries
- Deep plantar artery
- Lateral plantar artery
- Medial plantar artery
- Plantar metatarsal arteries
- Proper plantar digital arteries
