= Marginal vein =

Marginal vein may refer to:

== In the heart ==
- Left marginal vein (vena marginalis sinistra)
- Right marginal vein (vena marginalis dextra)

== In the foot ==
- Lateral marginal vein (vena marginalis lateralis pedis)
- Medial marginal vein (vena marginalis medialis pedis)
