= Malleolar artery =

Malleolar artery may refer to:

- Anterior lateral malleolar artery
- Anterior medial malleolar artery
