= Lateral marginal vein =

Details
- Drains from: Dorsal venous arch of the foot
- Drains to: Small saphenous vein

Identifiers
- Latin: vena marginalis lateralis pedis
- TA98: A12.3.11.020
- TA2: 5086
- FMA: 44359

The lateral marginal vein is a continuation of the dorsal venous arch of the foot. It is the origin of the small saphenous vein.

== See also ==
- Medial marginal vein
