= Lateral plantar =

Lateral plantar may refer to:

- Lateral plantar nerve
- Lateral plantar artery
