= Medial tarsal arteries =

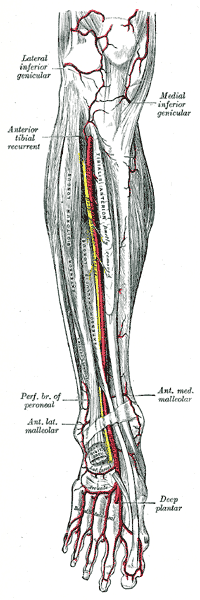
- Anterior tibial artery, dorsalis pedis artery and the muscles and bones of the leg - anterior view. (Medial tarsal visible but not labeled, at bottom right.)

Details
- Source: Arteria dorsalis pedis

Identifiers
- Latin: arteriae tarsales mediales
- TA98: A12.2.16.050
- TA2: 4716
- FMA: 70818

The medial tarsal arteries are two or three small branches which ramify on the medial border of the foot and join the medial malleolar network.
