= Plantar metatarsal arteries =

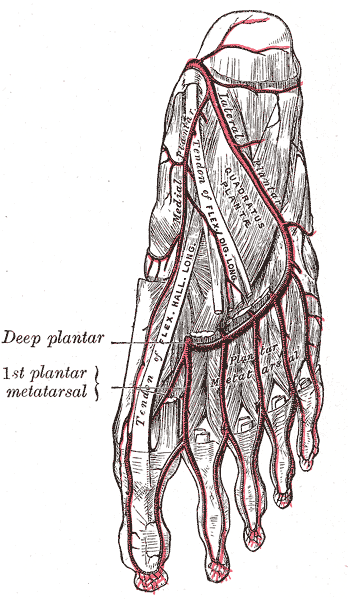
- The plantar arteries. Deep view. (Plantar metatarsal arteries labeled at bottom right.)

Details
- Source: Plantar arch
- Vein: Plantar metatarsal veins

Identifiers
- Latin: arteriae metatarsales plantares
- TA98: A12.2.16.066
- TA2: 4739
- FMA: 70820

The plantar metatarsal arteries (digital branches) are four in number, arising from the convexity of the plantar arch. They run forward between the metatarsal bones and in contact with the Interossei. They are located in the fourth layer of the foot.

Each divides into a pair of plantar digital arteries which supply the four webs and the adjacent sides of the toes.

Near their points of division each sends upward an anterior perforating branch to join the corresponding dorsal metatarsal artery.

The first plantar metatarsal artery (arteria princeps hallucis) springs from the junction between the lateral plantar and deep plantar arteries and sends a digital branch to the medial side of the first toe.

The digital branch for the lateral side of the fifth toe arise from the lateral plantar artery near the base of the fifth metatarsal bone.
