= Dorsal metatarsal arteries =

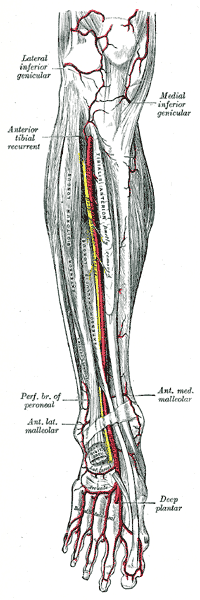
- Anterior tibial and dorsalis pedis arteries. (Dorsal metatarsal arteries not labeled, but visible at bottom.)

Details
- Source: Arcuate artery of the foot
- Vein: Dorsal metatarsal veins

Identifiers
- Latin: arteriae metatarsales dorsales
- TA98: A12.2.16.052
- TA2: 4718
- FMA: 70819

The arcuate artery of the foot gives off the second, third, and fourth dorsal metatarsal arteries, which run forward upon the corresponding Interossei dorsales; in the clefts between the toes, each divides into two dorsal digital branches for the adjoining toes.

At the proximal parts of the interosseous spaces these vessels receive the posterior perforating branches from the plantar arch, and at the distal parts of the spaces they are joined by the anterior perforating branches, from the plantar metatarsal arteries.

The fourth dorsal metatarsal artery gives off a branch which supplies the lateral side of the fifth toe.

The first dorsal metatarsal artery runs forward on the first Interosseous dorsalis.
