= Fascial hernia =

- Specialty: Dermatology

Fascial hernias in the form of nodules appear in the skin where the deep and superficial veins meet going through the fascia, most frequently occurring on the lower extremities, becoming prominent when the underlying muscles contract.

== See also ==
- Skin lesion
