= Tibial recurrent artery =

Tibial recurrent artery may refer to:

- Anterior tibial recurrent artery
- Posterior tibial recurrent artery
