= Tarsal artery =

Tarsal artery may refer to:

- Lateral tarsal artery
- Medial tarsal arteries
