= Dorsal digital veins =

Dorsal digital veins may refer to:

- dorsal digital veins of the hand
- dorsal digital veins of the foot
