= Posterior tibial =

Posterior tibial may refer to:

- Posterior tibial artery
- Posterior tibial vein
- Posterior tibial tendon

== See also ==
- Tibialis posterior muscle
- Anterior tibial (disambiguation)
