= Plantar digital veins =

Details
- Drains to: plantar metatarsal veins

Identifiers
- Latin: venae digitales plantares
- TA98: A12.3.11.018
- TA2: 5084
- FMA: 70919

The plantar digital veins arise from plexuses on the plantar surfaces of the digits, and, after sending intercapitular veins to join the dorsal digital veins, unite to form four metatarsal veins.
