= Tarsal =

Tarsal may refer to:

- Tarsal artery (disambiguation)
- Tarsal bones
- Tarsal glands
- Tarsus (eyelids) (eye)
- Superior tarsal muscle (eye)

== See also ==
- Tarsalia (bee), a genus of bees
- Gen. Tarsal, a character in the Adventure Time episode "Dentist"
