= Bühler's anastomotic artery =

Arc of Bühler

In human anatomy, Bühler's anastomotic artery (also called the arc of Bühler) is a rare anastomotic shunt joining the superior mesenteric artery and the celiac trunk in vertical orientation. As these arteries arise separately from different levels of the abdominal aorta, the shunt provides limited collateral circulation should a blockage occur in the intervening arterial segment. Bühler's artery is a rare phenomenon present in up to 3% of the population, and is thought to be an unobliterated remnant of the ventral longitudinal anastomosis present during embryological development.
