= Deep plantar artery =

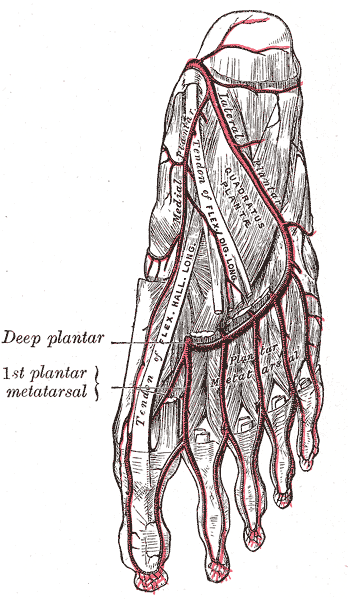
- The plantar arteries. Deep view. (Deep plantar labeled at center left.)

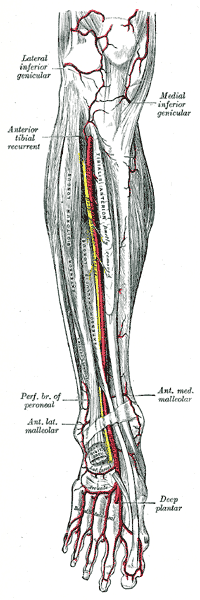
- Anterior tibial and dorsalis pedis arteries. (Deep plantar labeled at bottom right.)

Details
- Source: Dorsalis pedis artery

Identifiers
- Latin: arteria plantaris profunda
- TA98: A12.2.16.054
- TA2: 4720
- FMA: 69513

The deep plantar artery (ramus plantaris profundus; communicating artery) descends into the sole of the foot, between the two heads of the 1st interosseous dorsalis, and unites with the termination of the lateral plantar artery, to complete the plantar arch.

It sends a branch along the medial side of the great toe and continues forward along the first interosseous space as the first plantar metatarsal artery, which bifurcates for the supply of the adjacent sides of the great and second toes.
