= Deep vein =

Veins deep in the body; contrasted with superficial veins

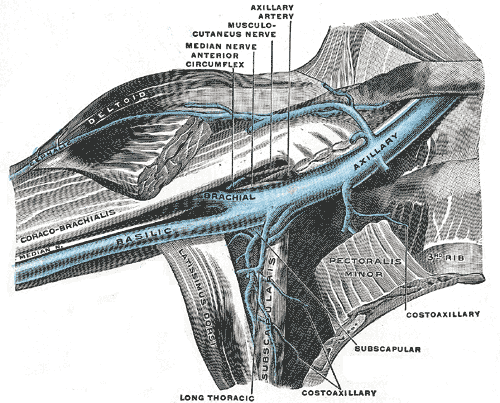
- The veins of the right axilla, viewed from in front.

Details

Identifiers
- Latin: vena profunda
- TA98: A12.0.00.035
- TA2: 3909
- FMA: 76718

A deep vein is a vein that is deep in the body. This contrasts with superficial veins that are close to the body's surface.

Deep veins are almost always beside an artery with the same name (e.g. the femoral vein is beside the femoral artery). Collectively, they carry the vast majority of the blood. Occlusion of a deep vein can be life-threatening and is most often caused by thrombosis. Occlusion of a deep vein by thrombosis is called deep vein thrombosis.

Because of their location deep within the body, operation on these veins can be difficult.

== List ==
- Internal jugular vein

=== Upper limb ===
- Brachial vein
- Axillary vein
- Subclavian vein

=== Lower limb ===
- Common femoral vein
- Femoral vein
- Profunda femoris vein
- Popliteal vein
- Peroneal vein
- Anterior tibial vein
- Posterior tibial vein
