= Anterior medial malleolar artery =

Artery in the ankle

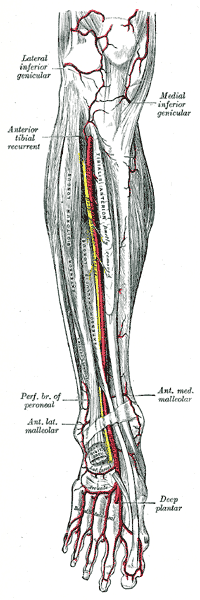
- Anterior tibial and dorsalis pedis arteries (anterior medial malleolar artery visible at bottom right.)

Details
- Source: Anterior tibial artery

Identifiers
- Latin: arteria malleolaris anterior medialis
- TA98: A12.2.16.046
- TA2: 4712
- FMA: 43905

The anterior medial malleolar artery (medial anterior malleolar artery, internal malleolar artery) is an artery in the ankle. It arises about 5 cm. above the ankle-joint from the anterior tibial artery.

The anterior medial malleolar artery passes behind the tendons of the extensor hallucis longus and tibialis anterior muscles, to the medial side of the ankle, upon which it ramifies, anastomosing with branches of the posterior tibial and medial plantar arteries and with the medial calcaneal from the posterior tibial.
