= Anterior tibial vein =

Vein in human leg

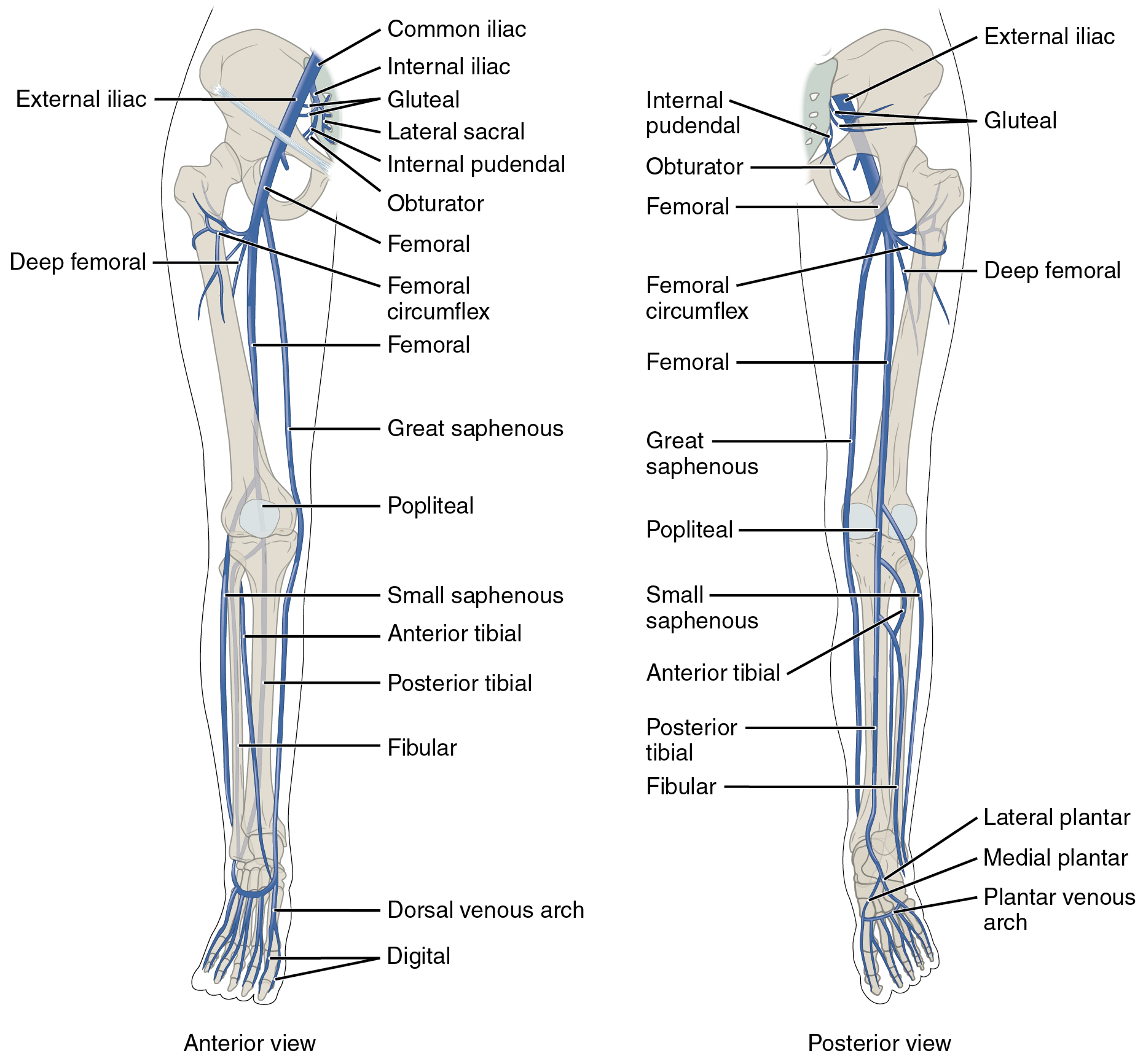
- Veins of the leg, where the anterior tibial vein is the lateral one of the "Tibial veins".

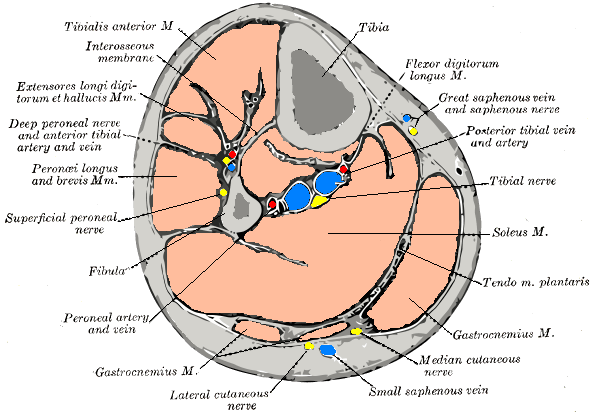
- Cross-section through middle of leg.

Details
- Drains to: Popliteal vein
- Artery: Anterior tibial artery

Identifiers
- Latin: vena tibialis anterior (singular) venae tibiales anteriores (plural)
- TA98: A12.3.11.031
- TA2: 5075
- FMA: 44331 70925, 44331

The anterior tibial vein is a vein in the lower leg.

In human anatomy, there are two anterior tibial veins. They originate and receive blood from the dorsal venous arch, on the back of the foot and empties into the popliteal vein.

The anterior tibial veins drain the ankle joint, knee joint, tibiofibular joint, and the anterior portion of the lower leg.

The two anterior tibial veins ascend in the interosseous membrane between the tibia and fibula and unite with the posterior tibial veins to form the popliteal vein.

Like most deep veins in legs, anterior tibial veins are accompanied by the homonym artery, the anterior tibial artery, along its course.
