= Medial marginal vein =

Details
- Drains from: Dorsal venous arch of the foot
- Drains to: Great saphenous vein

Identifiers
- Latin: vena marginalis medialis pedis
- TA98: A12.3.11.021
- TA2: 5069
- FMA: 44420

The medial marginal vein is a continuation of the dorsal venous arch of the foot and is the origin of the great saphenous vein.

== See also ==
- Lateral marginal vein
