= Posterior tibial recurrent artery =

Details
- Source: Anterior tibial artery

Identifiers
- Latin: arteria recurrens tibialis posterior
- TA98: A12.2.16.044
- TA2: 4710
- FMA: 43903

The posterior tibial recurrent artery, an inconstant branch, is given off from the anterior tibial before that vessel passes through the gap between superior tibio-fibular joint and upper border of interosseous membrane.

It ascends in front of the popliteus muscle, which it supplies, and anastomoses with the inferior genicular branches of the popliteal artery, giving an offset to the tibiofibular joint.
