= Plantar arch =

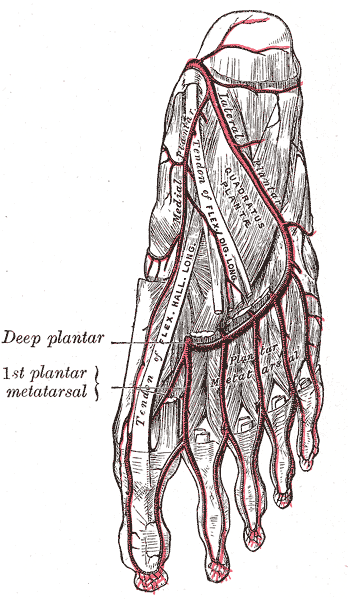
- The plantar arteries. Deep view.

Details
- Source: Lateral plantar artery, deep plantar artery
- Branches: Plantar metatarsal arteries
- Vein: Plantar venous arch

Identifiers
- Latin: arcus plantaris profundus
- TA98: A12.2.16.065
- TA2: 4738
- FMA: 43942

The plantar arch is a circulatory anastomosis formed from:

- deep plantar artery, from the dorsalis pedis - a.k.a. dorsal artery of the foot
- lateral plantar artery

The plantar arch supplies the underside, or sole, of the foot.

The plantar arch runs from the 5th metatarsal and extends medially to the 1st metatarsal (of the big toe).

The arch is formed when the lateral plantar artery turns medially to the interval between the bases of the first and second metatarsal bones, where it unites with the deep plantar branch of the dorsalis pedis artery, thus completing the plantar arch (or deep plantar arch).
