= Plantar venous arch =

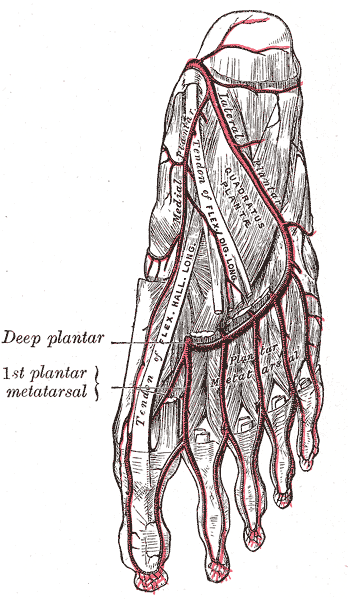
- The plantar arteries. Deep view. (Veins not shown, but path of veins is similar to that of arteries.)

Details
- Artery: plantar arch

Identifiers
- Latin: arcus venosus plantaris
- TA98: A12.3.11.016
- TA2: 5082
- FMA: 44489

The four plantar metatarsal veins run backward in the metatarsal spaces, communicate, by means of perforating veins, with the veins on the dorsum of the foot, and unite to form the plantar venous arch (or deep plantar venous arch) which lies alongside the plantar arterial arch.

From the deep plantar venous arch the medial and lateral plantar veins run backward close to the corresponding arteries and, after communicating with the great and small saphenous veins, unite behind the medial malleolus to form the posterior tibial veins.
