= Anterior lateral malleolar artery =

Ankle artery

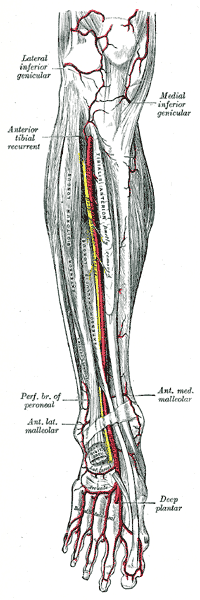
- Anterior tibial and dorsalis pedis arteries (anterior lateral malleolar arterylabeled at bottom left.)

Details
- Source: Anterior tibial artery

Identifiers
- Latin: arteria malleolaris anterior lateralis
- TA98: A12.2.16.045
- TA2: 4711
- FMA: 43904

The anterior lateral malleolar artery (lateral anterior malleolar artery, external malleolar artery) is an artery in the ankle.

The anterior lateral malleolar artery is a branch of the anterior tibial artery. It passes beneath the tendons of the extensor digitorum longus and fibularis tertius and supplies the lateral side of the ankle. It forms anastomoses with the perforating branch of the fibular artery, and with ascending twigs from the lateral tarsal artery.
