= Plantar metatarsal veins =

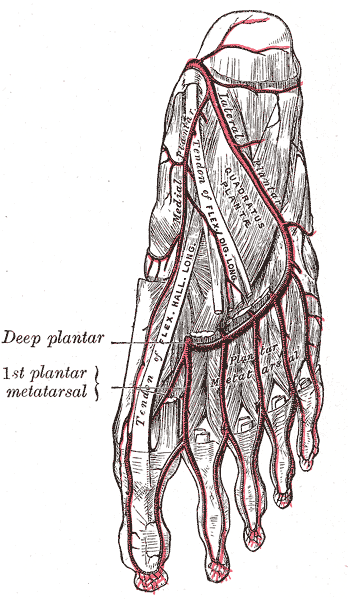
- The plantar arteries. Deep view. (Plantar metatarsal veins not visible, but location is similar to that of plantar metatarsal arteries, which are labeled at bottom right.)

Details
- Source: Plantar digital veins
- Drains to: Plantar venous arch
- Artery: Plantar metatarsal arteries

Identifiers
- Latin: venae metatarsales plantares
- TA98: A12.3.11.017
- TA2: 5083
- FMA: 70918

The plantar metatarsal veins run backward in the metatarsal spaces, collect blood from digital veins and communicate, by means of perforating veins, with the veins on the dorsum of the foot, and unite to form the deep plantar venous arch which lies alongside the plantar arterial arch.
