= Fibular veins =

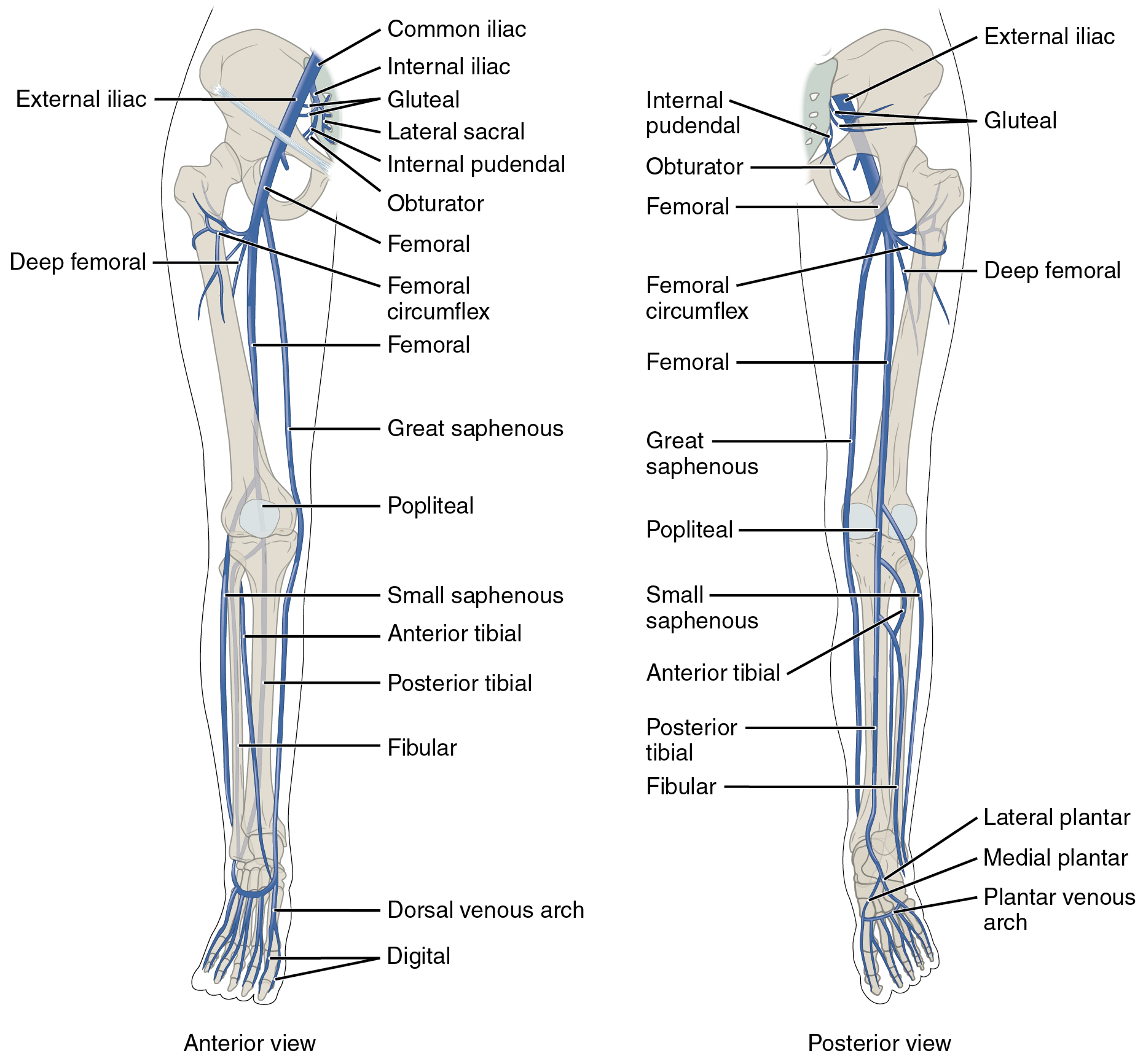
- Front and back views of leg veins including fibular veins

Details
- Drains to: Posterior tibial
- Artery: Fibular artery

Identifiers
- Latin: venae fibulares
- TA98: A12.3.11.033
- TA2: 5078
- FMA: 21246

In anatomy, the fibular veins (also known as peroneal veins) are accompanying veins (venae comitantes) of the fibular artery.

== Structure ==
The fibular veins are deep veins that help carry blood from the lateral compartment of the leg. They drain into the posterior tibial veins, which in turn drain into the popliteal vein. The fibular veins accompany the fibular artery.

== See also ==
- Fibular artery
- Common fibular nerve
- Venae comitantes

== Additional images ==
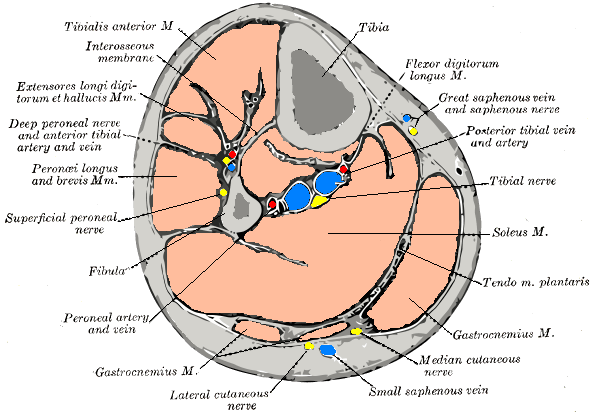
Cross-section through middle of leg.

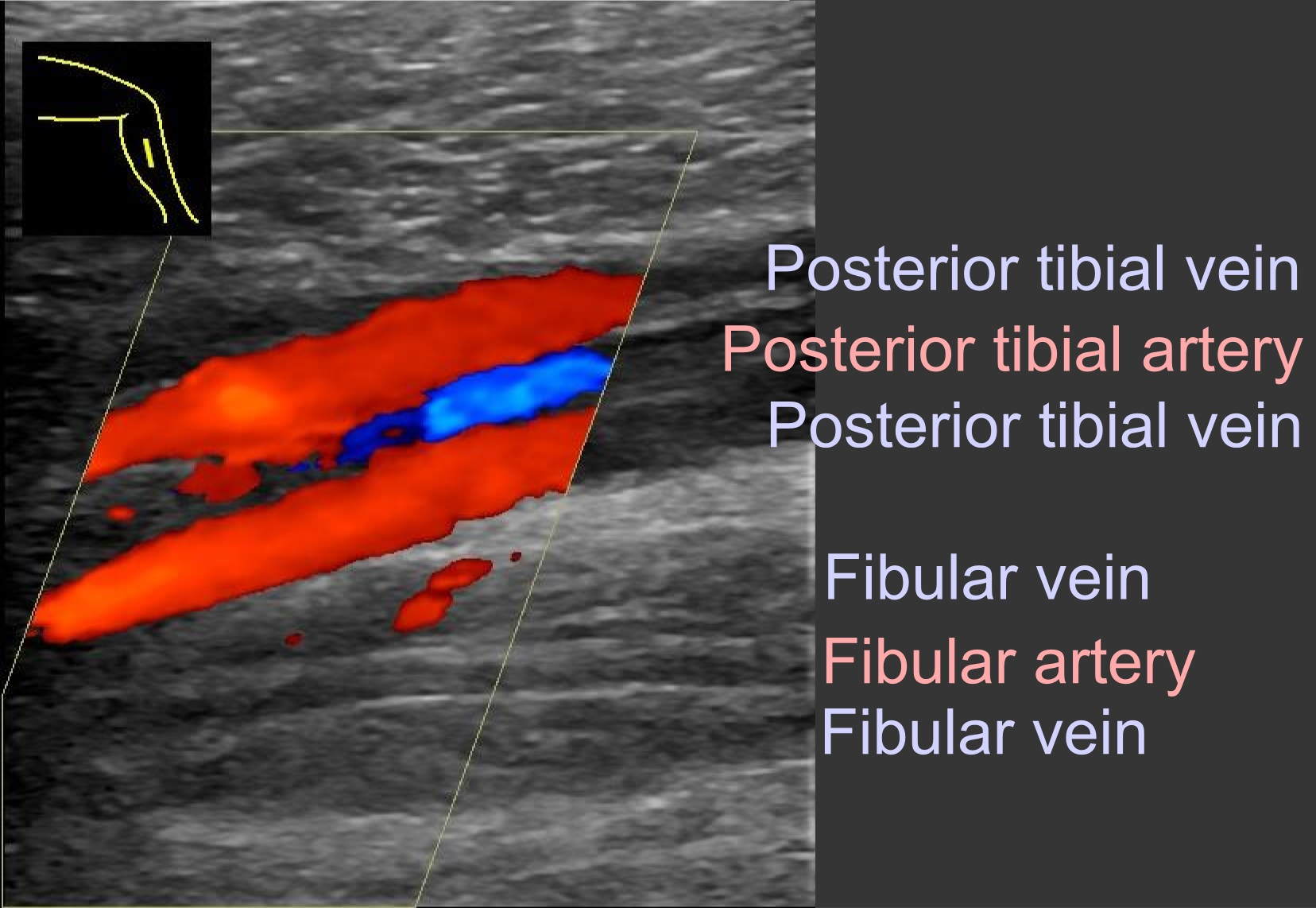
Coronal plane (seen from medial side of lower leg) ultrasonography of deep vein thrombosis of the fibular veins, seen as hyperechoic content and only marginal blood flow.
