= Dorsal metatarsal veins =

Details
- Source: Dorsal digital veins of the foot
- Drains to: Dorsal venous arch of the foot
- Artery: Dorsal metatarsal arteries

Identifiers
- Latin: venae metatarsales dorsales
- TA98: A12.3.11.013
- TA2: 5089
- FMA: 70916

The dorsal metatarsal veins are veins which drain the metatarsus of the foot.
