= Popliteal vein =

Large leg vein

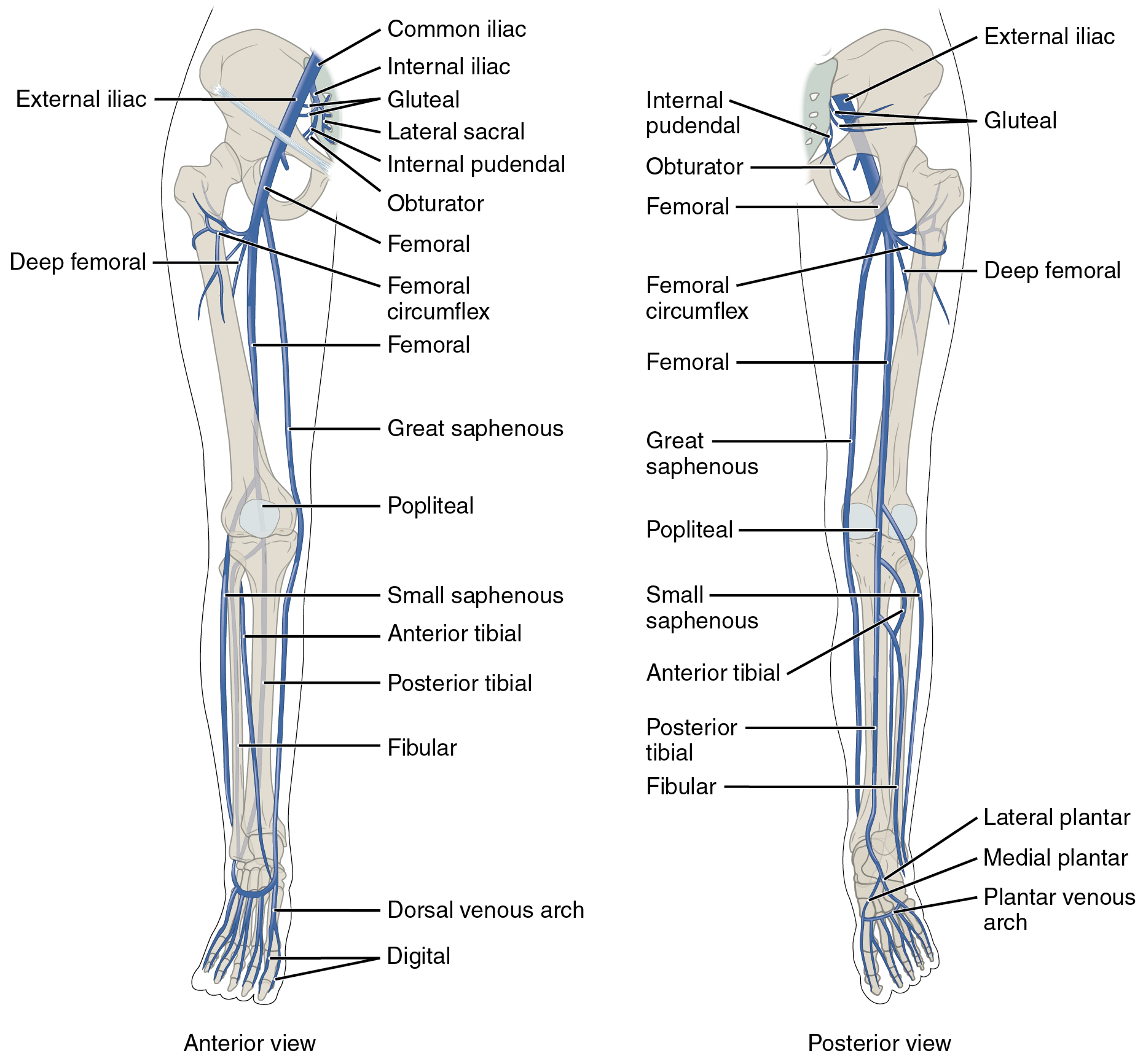
- Front and back views of popliteal and other veins

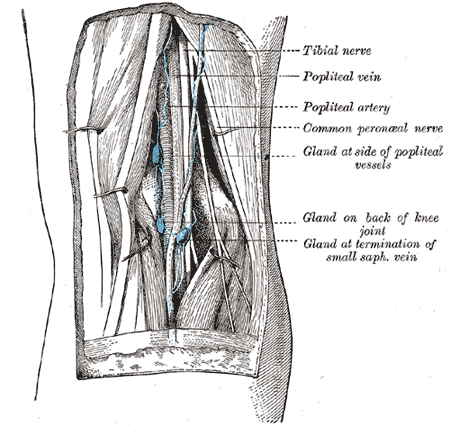
- Lymph glands of popliteal fossa, with popliteal vein labeled.

Details
- Source: Anterior tibial, posterior tibial, small saphenous
- Drains to: Femoral vein
- Artery: Popliteal artery

Identifiers
- Latin: vena poplitea
- MeSH: D011152
- TA98: A12.3.11.028
- TA2: 5072
- FMA: 44327

The popliteal vein is a vein of the lower limb. It is formed from the anterior tibial vein and the posterior tibial vein. It travels medial to the popliteal artery, and becomes the femoral vein. It drains blood from the leg. It can be assessed using medical ultrasound. It can be affected by popliteal vein entrapment.

== Structure ==
The popliteal vein is formed by the junction of the venae comitantes of the anterior tibial vein and the posterior tibial vein at the lower border of the popliteus muscle. It travels on the medial side of the popliteal artery. It is superficial to the popliteal artery. As it ascends through the fossa, it crosses behind the popliteal artery so that it comes to lie on its lateral side. It passes through the adductor hiatus (the opening in the adductor magnus muscle) to become the femoral vein.

=== Tributaries ===
The tributaries of the popliteal vein include:

- Veins that correspond to branches given off by the popliteal artery (see popliteal artery).
- the small saphenous vein, which perforates the deep fascia and passes between the two heads of the gastrocnemius muscle to end in the popliteal vein.
- the fibular veins.

=== Variation ===
The popliteal vein may be doubled in up to 35% of people.

== Function ==
The popliteal vein drains blood from the leg.

== Clinical significance ==
The popliteal vein is readily palpated in the popliteal fossa adjacent to the adductor magnus muscle.

The popliteal vein can be visualised using medical ultrasound, including Doppler ultrasonography. It may be affected by a thrombus.

=== Popliteal vein entrapment ===
The popliteal vein may become trapped. This reduces the flow of blood out of the leg, causing oedema, pain, and venous ulcers. Entrapment is usually caused by gastrocnemius muscle. Venography (using an x-ray) or magnetic resonance imaging can investigate it. Surgery can be used to remove tissue creating pressure.

== Additional images ==
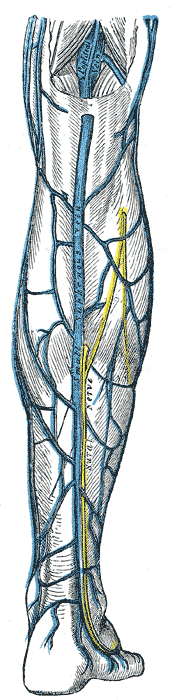
The small saphenous vein. Popliteal vein is labeled at top.

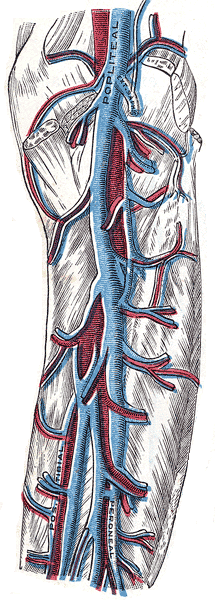
The popliteal vein

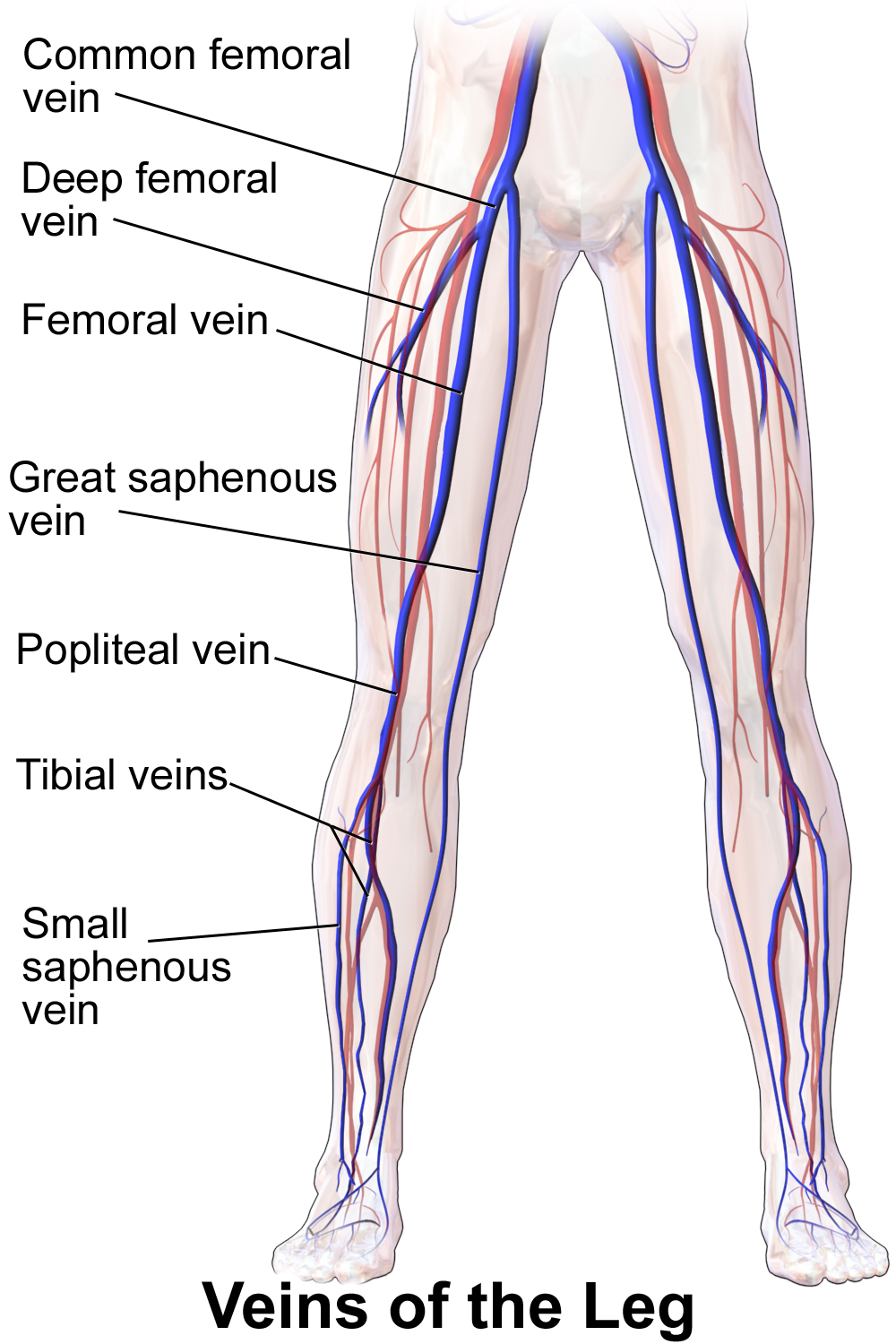
Veins of the leg
