= Plantar digital arteries =

Plantar digital arteries may refer to:

- Common plantar digital arteries
- Proper plantar digital arteries
