= Dorsal digital veins of the foot =

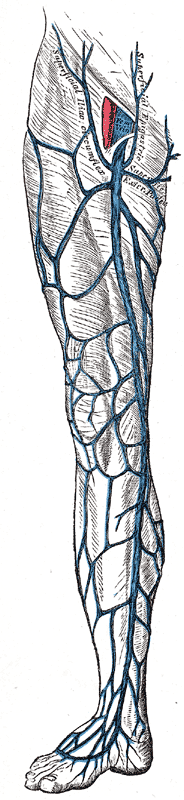

Details
- Drains to: dorsal metatarsal veins

Identifiers
- Latin: venae digitales dorsales pedis
- TA98: A12.3.11.014
- TA2: 5090
- FMA: 70917

On the dorsum of the foot the dorsal digital veins receive, in the clefts between the toes, the intercapitular veins from the plantar venous arch and join to form short common digital veins.
