= Skeletal muscle pump =

Muscular system aiding blood circulation

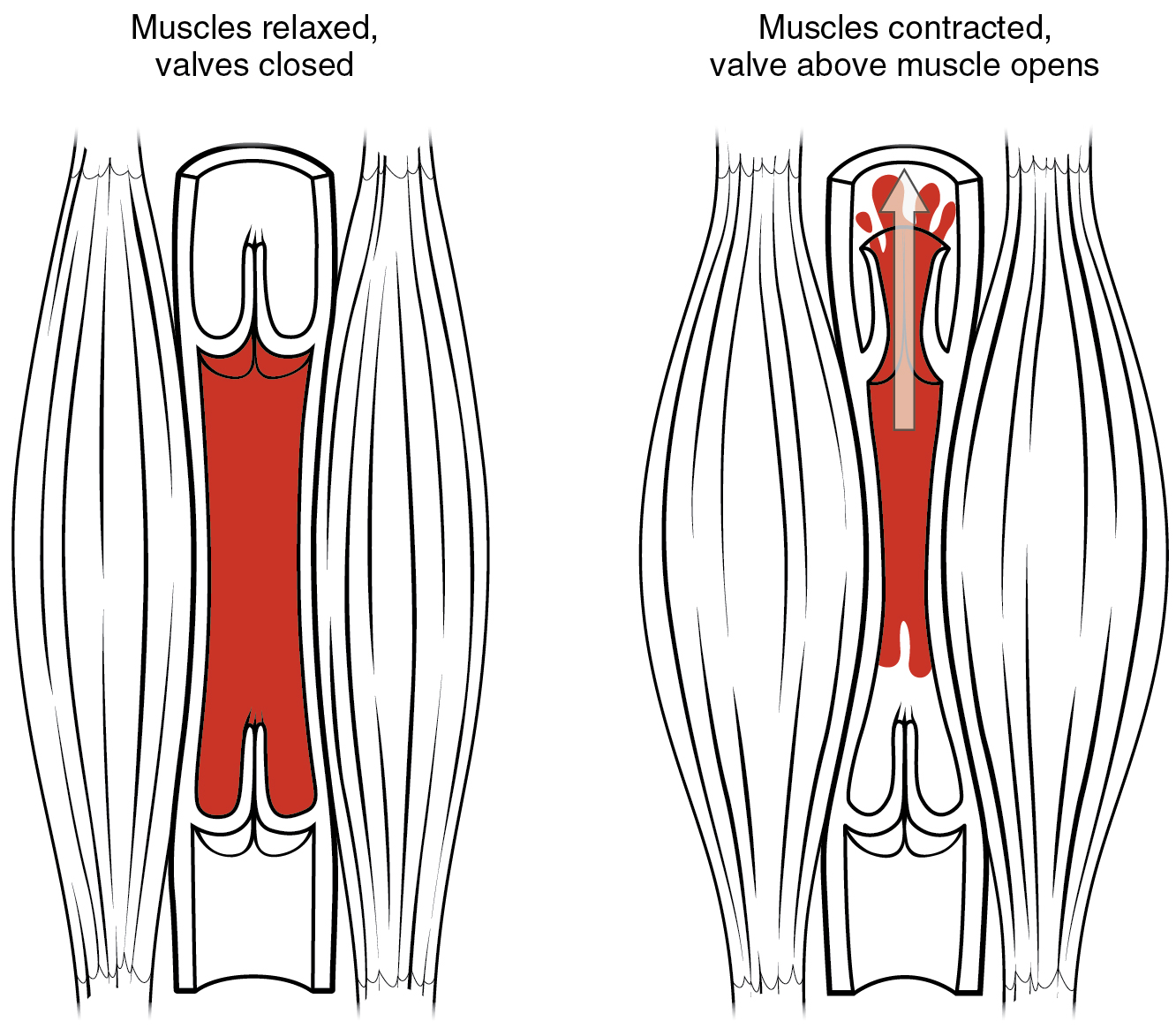
The skeletal muscle pump

The skeletal muscle pump or musculovenous pump is a collection of skeletal muscles that aid the heart in the circulation of blood. It is especially important in increasing venous return to the heart, but may also play a role in arterial blood flow.

== General ==
The skeletal muscle pump is vital in negating orthostatic intolerance when standing. When moving upright, the blood volume moves to the peripheral parts of the body. To combat this, the muscles involved in standing contract and help to bring venous blood volume to the heart. The pump is important in affecting the central and local supply of blood output. Venous return, cardiac output, and stroke volume were all increased during exercise experiments, as well as affecting the local muscle being used, blood volume.

== Calf muscle pump ==
The calf muscles help propel blood against gravity towards your heart and are sometimes referred to as the body's "second heart".

The calf muscle pump is an important component of the skeletal muscle pump in the lower limbs and contributes to venous return during movement. Contraction of the calf muscles displaces blood from the veins of the lower leg, while competent venous valves help prevent backward flow. Effective calf pump function is associated with reduced blood pooling in the legs and ankles, potentially reducing discomfort and the risk of swollen ankles and deep vein thrombosis.

People with chronic venous disease tend to have a less effective calf muscle pump. A systematic review of ten studies found that, compared with healthy individuals, they were less effective at pumping blood out of their lower legs and experienced faster refilling of their leg vein, increasing venous pressure.

Exercise training may improve calf muscle pump function in people with chronic venous insufficiency. A 2017 systematic review and meta-analysis of 14 studies involving 519 participants found that exercise aimed at improving calf muscle strength and ankle range of motion improved measures of calf muscle pump hemodynamics and function. A later systematic review also reported improvements in calf pump function, muscle strength, and ankle range of motion, although the effects varied according to disease severity and the outcomes measured. European Society for Vascular Surgery guidelines state that physical exercise targeting lower-limb muscle strength and ankle mobility may strengthen the calf muscle pump and facilitate venous return.

== Arterial blood pumping ==
Between muscle relaxations, intramuscular pressure transiently returns to a level below the venous blood pressure. This allows blood from the capillary system to refill the veins until the next contraction. It is postulated that this change in pressure may be great enough to draw blood from the arterial side to the venous side. It is hypothesized that this pressure drop during rhythmic contraction actually increases blood flow through the muscle, and may be responsible for a portion of the increase in muscle blood flow immediately at the onset of activity. This explanation is attractive, because it would explain the readily observable tight coupling between muscle contraction and a rapid increase in muscle blood flow. However, recent evidence has emerged that cast doubts on this theory. Experiments have shown that a strong muscle contraction can occur without a corresponding increase in skeletal muscle blood flow. Given the proposed manner of action of the muscle pump to increase arterial blood flow, it would seem impossible for a muscle contraction and skeletal muscle hyperemia to be uncoupled. Another experiment recently was only able to find evidence that vasodilation, not the skeletal muscle pump, was responsible for maintaining proper pressure and blood return. This might have to do with the lack of rigorous physiological tests thus far used to be able to prove the pump.

Experiments have shown the use of passive leg exercises, where only vasodilation was used, was responsible for increased blood return.

== See also ==
- Tilt table test
