= Small saphenous vein =

Relatively large superficial vein of the posterior leg

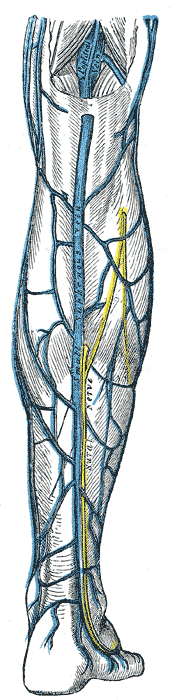
- Small saphenous vein and its tributaries. (Small saphenous vein labeled vertically at center.)

Details
- Source: Dorsal venous arch of the foot
- Drains to: Popliteal vein

Identifiers
- Latin: vena saphena parva
- TA98: A12.3.11.010
- TA2: 5085
- FMA: 44333

The small saphenous vein (also short saphenous vein or lesser saphenous vein) is a relatively large superficial vein of the posterior leg.

== Structure ==
The origin of the small saphenous vein (SSV) is where the dorsal vein from the fifth digit (smallest toe) merges with the dorsal venous arch of the foot, which attaches to the great saphenous vein (GSV). It is a superficial vein, being subcutaneous (just under the skin).

From its origin, it courses around the lateral aspect of the foot (inferior and posterior to the lateral malleolus) and runs along the posterior aspect of the leg (with the sural nerve), where it passes between the heads of the gastrocnemius muscle. This vein presents a number of different draining points. Usually, it drains into the popliteal vein, at or above the level of the knee joint.

=== Variation ===
Sometimes, the SSV joins the common gastrocnemius vein before draining in the popliteal vein.

Sometimes, it does not make contact with the popliteal vein, but goes up to drain in the GSV at a variable level.

Instead of draining in the popliteal vein, it can merge with the Giacomini vein and drain in the GSV at the superior 1/3 of the thigh.

== Clinical significance ==
=== Varicose veins ===
The small saphenous vein may become varicose. In 20% of cases, this is associated with chronic venous insufficiency. Vein stripping is an effective treatment.

=== Vein harvesting ===
The small saphenous vein may be harvested for transplant to elsewhere in the body, such as in coronary artery bypass surgery. Endoscopic vein harvesting can be used to extract the vein from the leg minimally invasively.

== See also ==
- Compression stockings
- Great saphenous vein
- Popliteal fossa

== Additional images ==
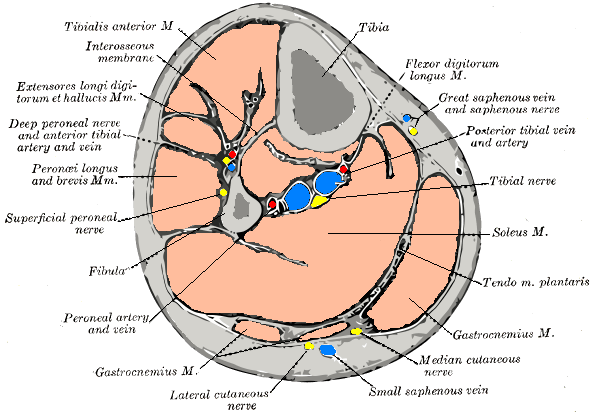
Cross-section through middle of leg

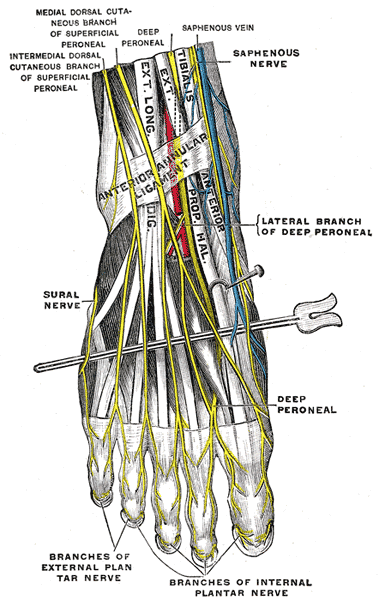
Nerves of the dorsum of the foot

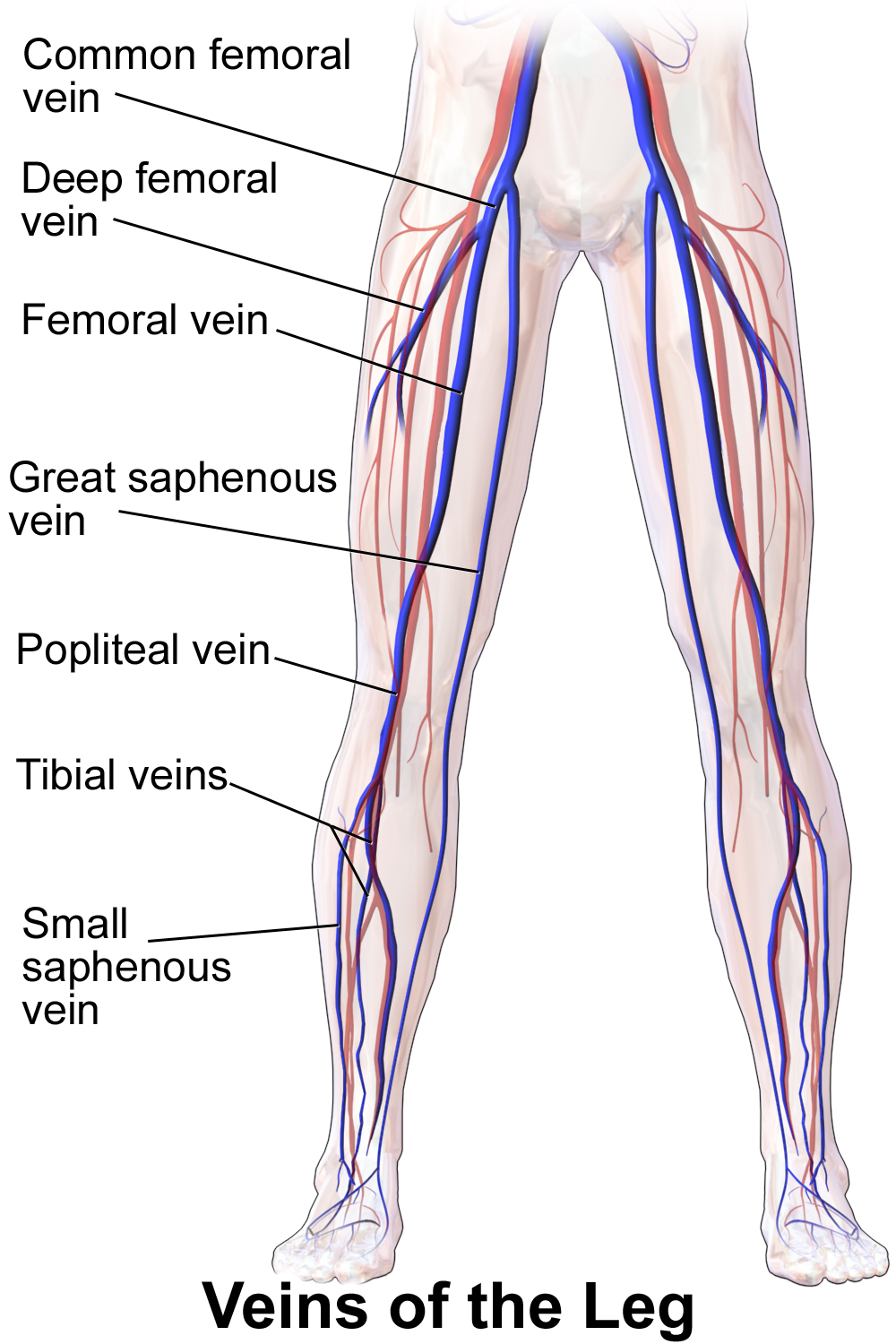
Veins of the leg
