= First dorsal metatarsal artery =

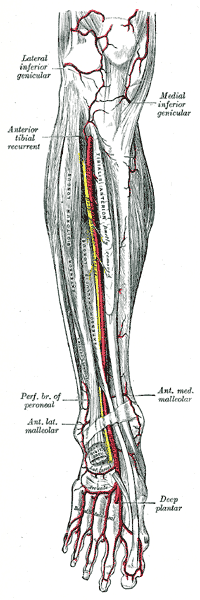
- Anterior tibial and dorsalis pedis arteries. (First dorsal metatarsal artery not labeled, but visible at bottom right.)

Details

Identifiers
- Latin: arteria dorsalis hallucis
- FMA: 44647

The first dorsal metatarsal artery is a small artery on the back of the foot. It runs forward on the first interosseous dorsalis muscle, and at the cleft between the great and second toes divides into two branches, one of which passes beneath the tendon of the extensor hallucis longus muscle, and is distributed to the medial border of the great toe; the other bifurcates to supply the adjoining sides of the great and second toes.

== See also ==
- Dorsal metatarsal arteries
