= Tibiofibular joint =

Tibiofibular joint may refer to:

- Superior tibiofibular joint
- Inferior tibiofibular joint
