= Anterior tibial artery =

Leg artery

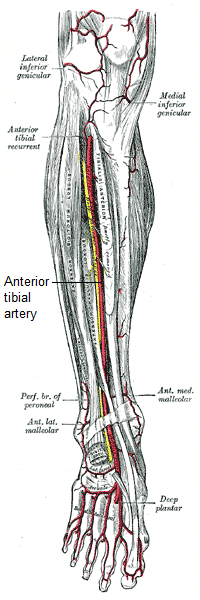

Details
- Source: Popliteal artery
- Branches: Post. tibial recurrent ant. tibial recurrent musc. branches ant. medial malleolar ant. lateral malleolar dorsalis pedis
- Vein: Anterior tibial vein
- Supplies: Anterior compartment of the leg

Identifiers
- Latin: arteria tibialis anterior
- TA98: A12.2.16.042
- TA2: 4708
- FMA: 43894

The anterior tibial artery is an artery of the leg. It carries blood to the anterior compartment of the leg and dorsal surface of the foot, from the popliteal artery.

== Structure ==
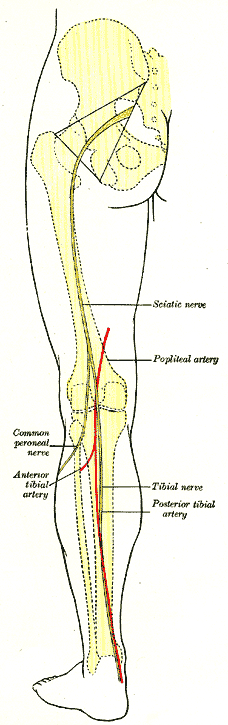
Back of left lower extremity, showing origin of anterior tibial artery before it continues on the anterior side.

=== Course ===
The anterior tibial artery is a branch of the popliteal artery. It originates at the distal end of the popliteus muscle posterior to the tibia. The artery typically passes anterior to the popliteus muscle prior to passing between the tibia and fibula through an oval opening at the superior aspect of the interosseus membrane. The artery then descends between the tibialis anterior and extensor digitorum longus muscles.

It is accompanied by the anterior tibial vein, and the deep peroneal nerve, along its course.

It crosses the anterior aspect of the ankle joint, at which point it becomes the dorsalis pedis artery.

=== Branches ===
The branches of the anterior tibial artery are:

- posterior tibial recurrent artery
- anterior tibial recurrent artery
- muscular branches
- anterior medial malleolar artery
- anterior lateral malleolar artery
- dorsalis pedis artery

== Clinical significance ==
As the artery passes medial to the fibular neck, it becomes vulnerable to damage during a tibial osteotomy.

== Additional images ==
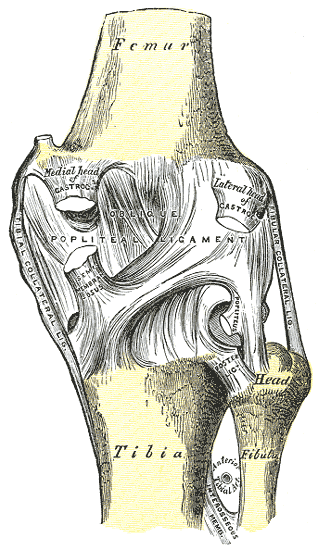
Right knee-joint. Posterior view.

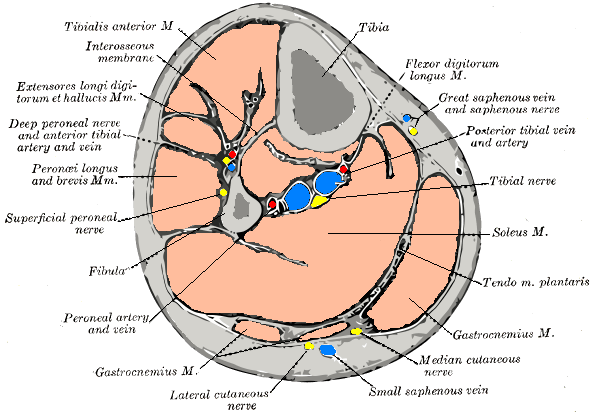
Cross-section through middle of leg.

Schema of the arteries of the thigh. Anterior tibial artery is labeled at the bottom.

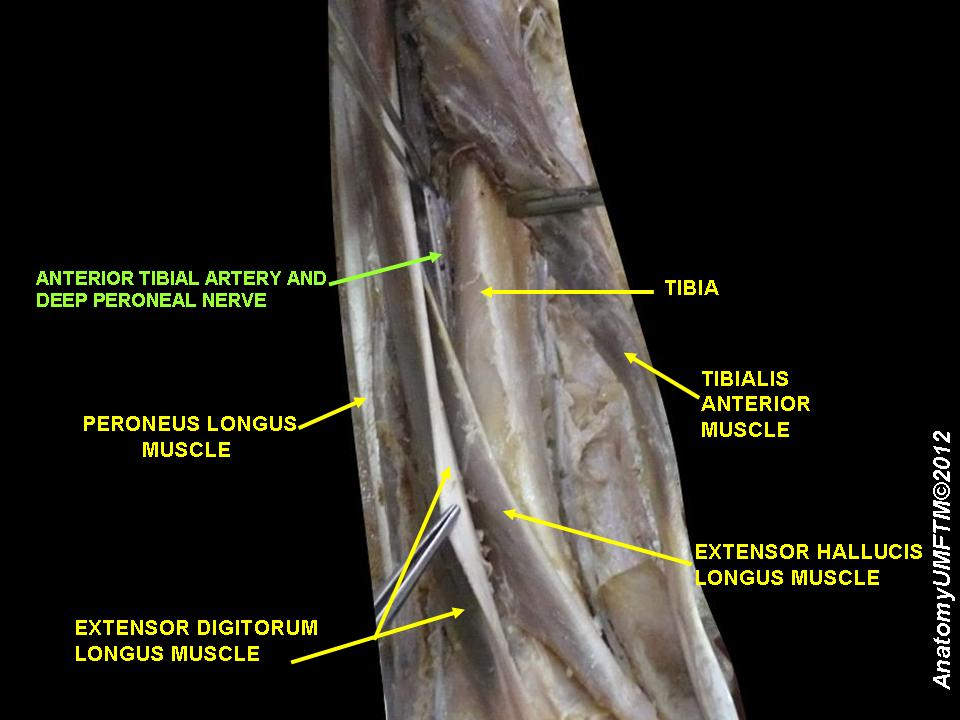
Anterior tibial artery

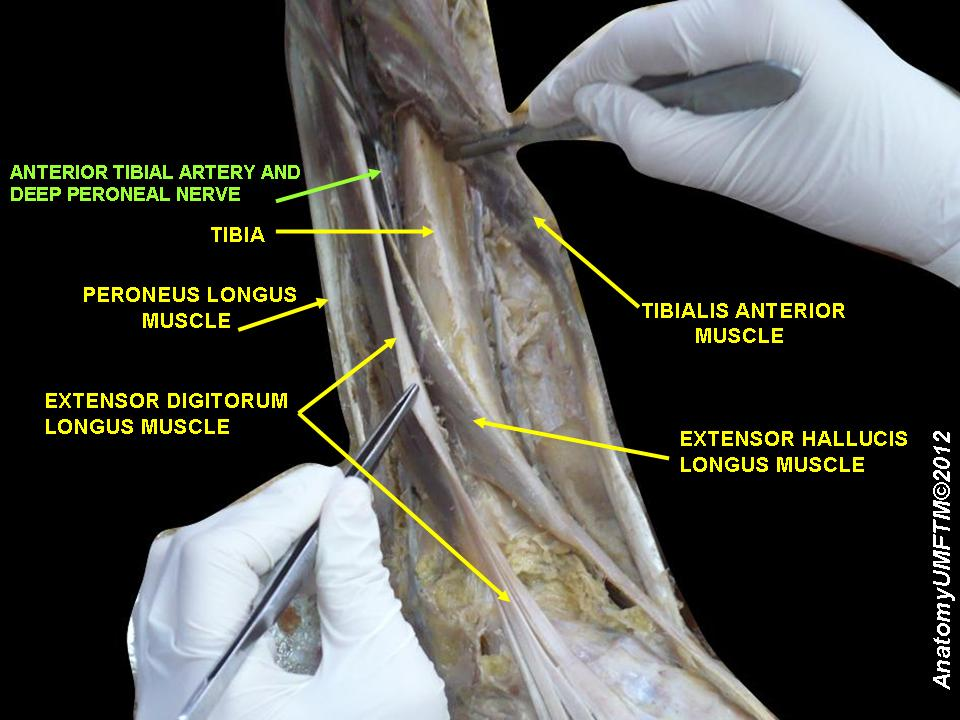
Anterior tibial artery

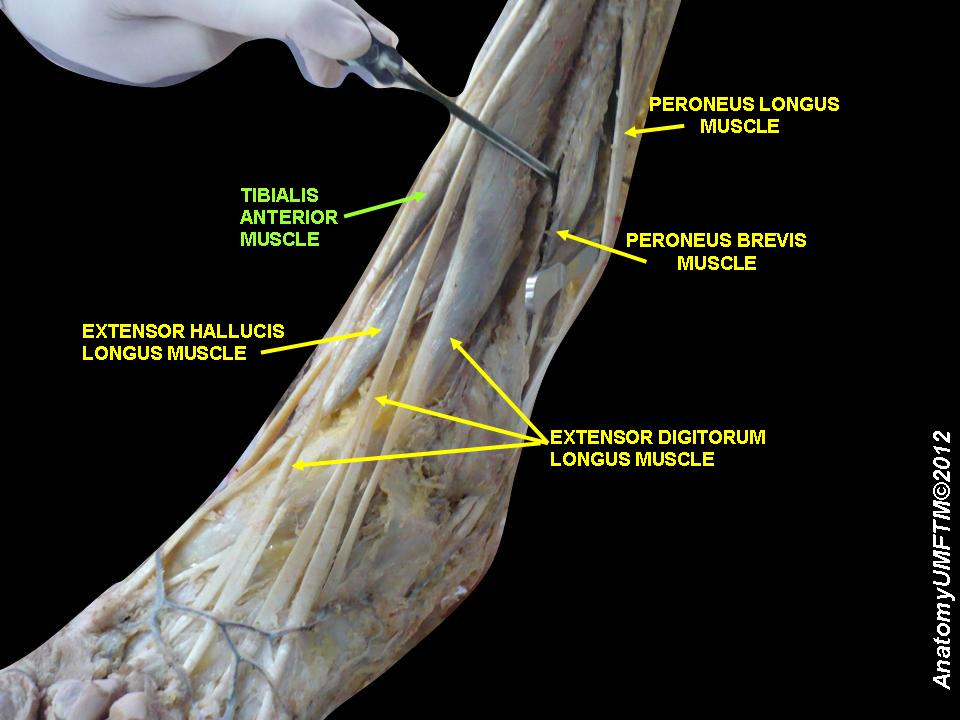
Anterior tibial artery
