= Dorsal venous arch of the foot =

Superficial vein

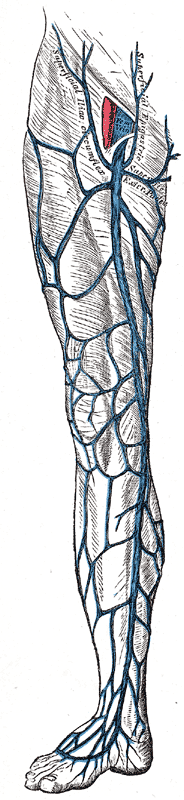
- The great saphenous vein and its tributaries.

Details
- Source: Dorsal metatarsal veins
- Drains to: Great saphenous vein
- Artery: Arcuate artery of the foot

Identifiers
- Latin: arcus venosus dorsalis pedis
- TA98: A12.3.11.012
- TA2: 5088
- FMA: 44356

The dorsal venous arch of the foot is a superficial vein that connects the small saphenous vein and the great saphenous vein. Anatomically, it is defined by where the dorsal veins of the first and fifth digit, respectively, meet the great saphenous vein and small saphenous vein.

It is usually fairly easy to palpate and visualize (if the patient is barefoot). It lies superior to the metatarsal bones approximately midway between the ankle joint and metatarsal phalangeal joints.

== Additional images ==
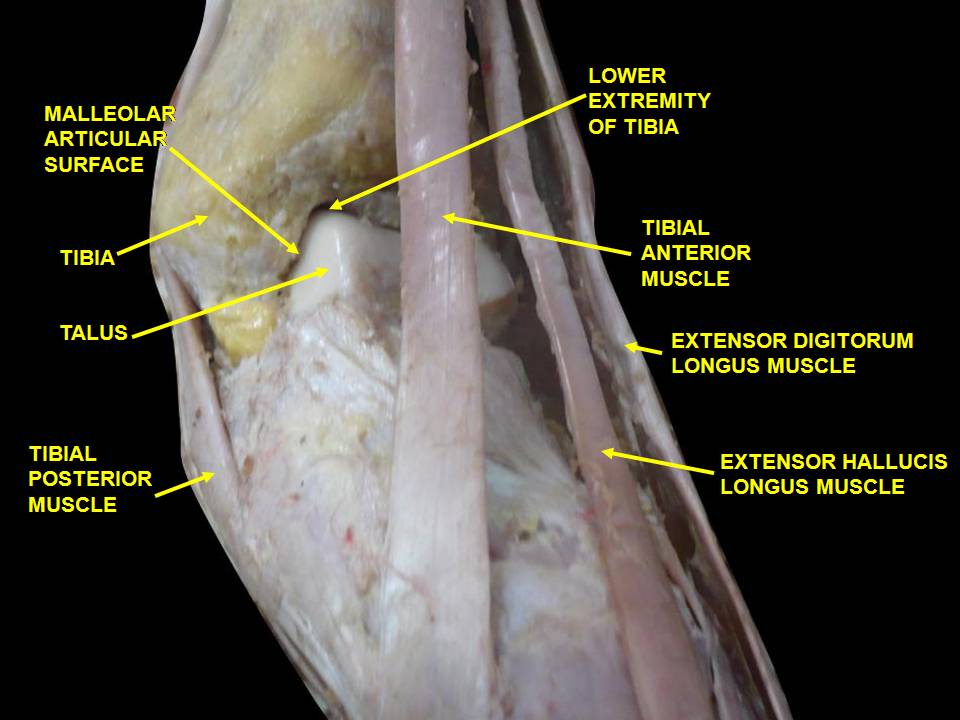
Dorsum of foot. Ankle joint. Deep dissection

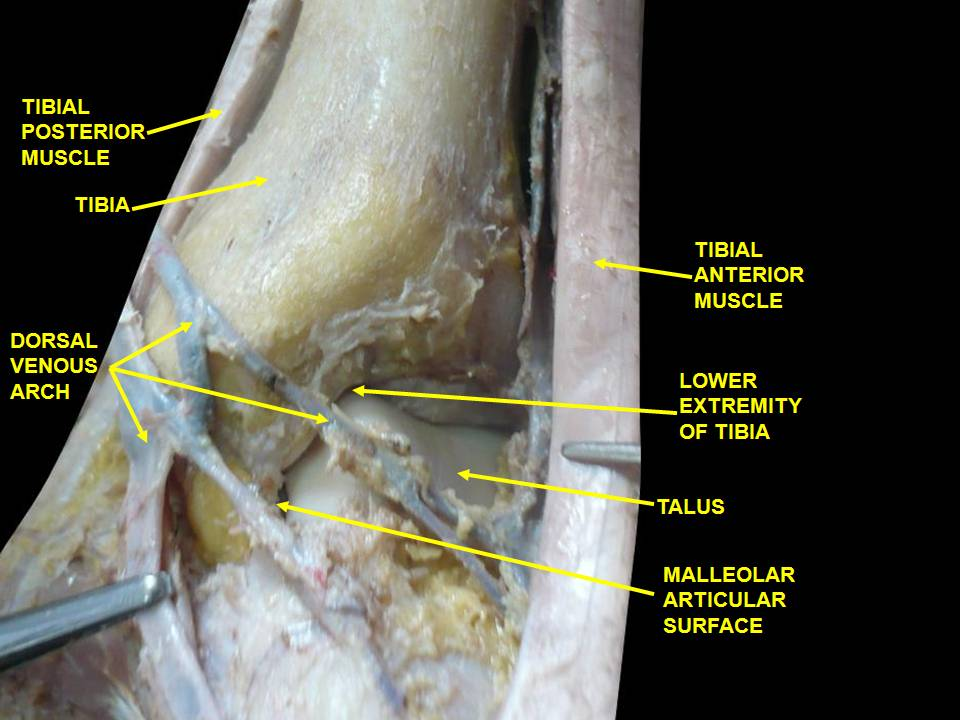
Dorsum of foot. Ankle joint. Deep dissection.
