= Lateral plantar artery =

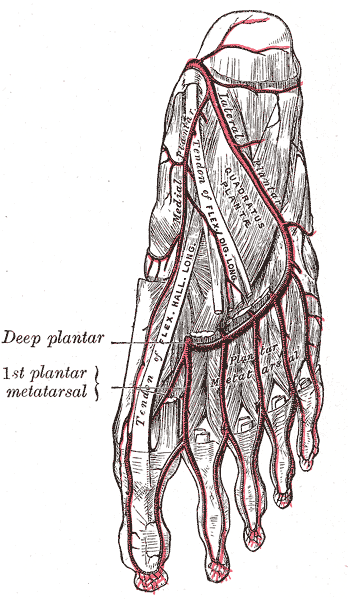
- The plantar arteries. Deep view. (Lateral plantar visible at center top.)

Details
- Source: Posterior tibial artery
- Supplies: Sole

Identifiers
- Latin: arteria plantaris lateralis
- TA98: A12.2.16.064
- TA2: 4737
- FMA: 43926

The lateral plantar artery (external plantar artery), much larger than the medial, passes obliquely lateralward and forward to the base of the fifth metatarsal bone.

It then turns medialward to the interval between the bases of the first and second metatarsal bones, where it unites with the deep plantar branch of the dorsalis pedis artery, thus completing the plantar arch.

As this artery passes lateralward, it is first placed between the calcaneus and Abductor hallucis, and then between the Flexor digitorum brevis and Quadratus plantæ as it runs forward to the base of the little toe it lies more superficially between the Flexor digitorum brevis and Abductor digiti quinti, covered by the plantar aponeurosis and integument.

The remaining portion of the vessel is deeply situated; it extends from the base of the fifth to the proximal part of the first interosseous space, and forms the plantar arch; it is convex forward, lies below the bases of the second, third, and fourth metatarsal bones and the corresponding Interossei, and upon the oblique part of the Adductor hallucis.

== Additional images ==
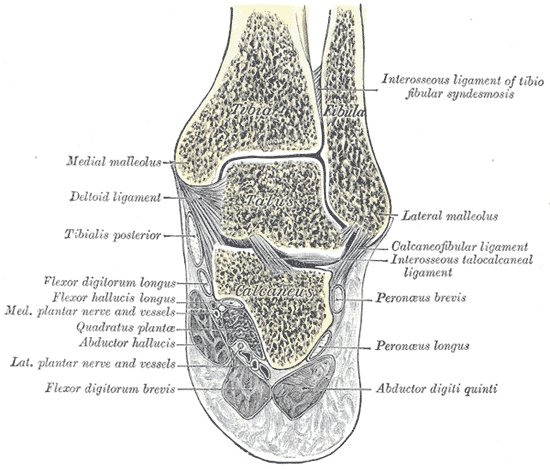
Coronal section through right talocrural and talocalcaneal joints.
