= Posterior tibial vein =

Vein of the leg

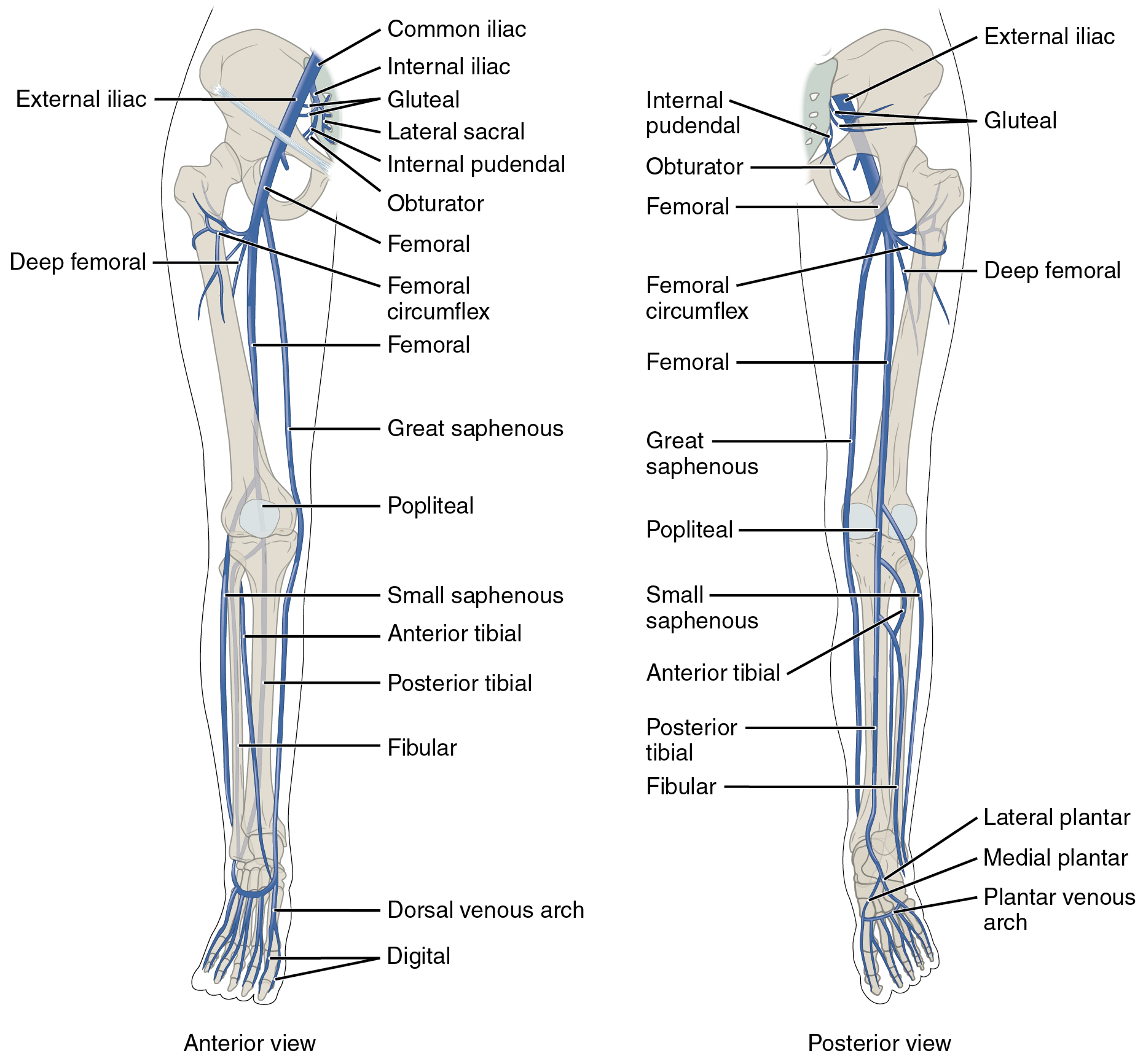
- Veins of the leg, where the posterior tibial vein is the medial one of the "Tibial veins".

Details
- Source: Fibular veins
- Drains to: Popliteal vein
- Artery: Posterior tibial artery

Identifiers
- Latin: venae tibiales posteriores
- TA98: A12.3.11.032
- TA2: 5077
- FMA: 44332

The posterior tibial veins are veins of the leg in humans. They drain the posterior compartment of the leg and the plantar surface of the foot to the popliteal vein.

== Structure ==
The posterior tibial veins receive blood from the medial and lateral plantar veins. They drain the posterior compartment of the leg and the plantar surface of the foot to the popliteal vein, which it forms when it joins with the anterior tibial vein.

The posterior tibial vein is accompanied by an homonym artery, the posterior tibial artery, along its course. It lies posterior to the medial malleolus in the ankle.

They receive the most important perforator veins: the Cockett perforators, superior, medial and inferior.

== Additional images ==
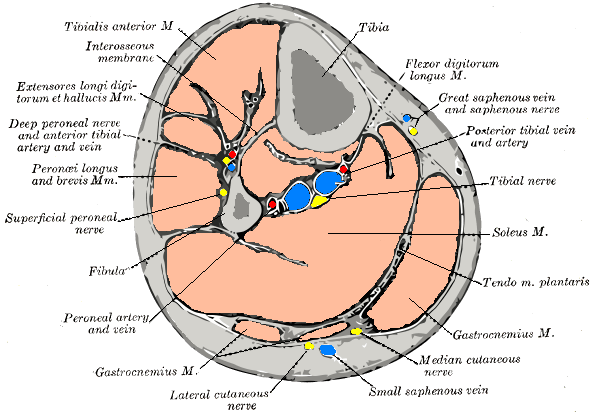
Cross-section through middle of leg.
