= Dorsalis pedis artery =

Artery of the foot

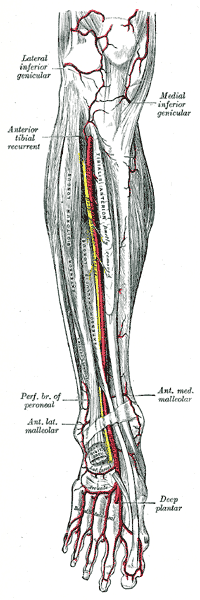
- Anterior tibial artery, dorsalis pedis artery and the muscles and bones of the leg (anterior view).

Details
- Source: Anterior tibial artery
- Branches: First dorsal metatarsal artery, deep plantar artery
- Supplies: Dorsal surface of the foot

Identifiers
- Latin: arteria dorsalis pedis
- TA98: A12.2.16.048
- TA2: 4714
- FMA: 43915

In human anatomy, the dorsalis pedis artery (dorsal artery of foot) is a blood vessel of the lower limb. It arises from the anterior tibial artery, and ends at the first intermetatarsal space (as the first dorsal metatarsal artery and the deep plantar artery). It carries oxygenated blood to the dorsal side of the foot. It is useful for taking a pulse. It is also at risk during anaesthesia of the deep peroneal nerve.

== Structure ==
The dorsalis pedis artery is located 1/3 from medial malleolus of the ankle. It arises at the anterior aspect of the ankle joint and is a continuation of the anterior tibial artery. It ends at the proximal part of the first intermetatarsal space. Here, it divides into two branches:

- The first dorsal metatarsal artery
- The deep plantar artery

It is covered by skin and fascia, but is fairly superficial.

The dorsalis pedis communicates with the plantar blood supply of the foot through the deep plantar artery. Along its course, it is accompanied by a deep vein, the dorsalis pedis vein.

== Function ==
The dorsalis pedis artery supplies oxygenated blood to the dorsal side of the foot.

== Clinical significance ==
=== Pulse ===
The dorsalis pedis artery pulse can be palpated readily lateral to the extensor hallucis longus tendon (or medially to the extensor digitorum longus tendon) on the dorsal surface of the foot, distal to the dorsal most prominence of the navicular bone which serves as a reliable landmark for palpation. It is often examined, by physicians, when assessing whether a given patient has peripheral vascular disease. It is absent, unilaterally or bilaterally, in 2–3% of young healthy individuals.

=== Ultrasound ===
The dorsalis pedis artery may be studied using ultrasound. Doppler ultrasound can be used to investigate blood flow.

=== Local anaesthesia ===
The dorsalis pedis artery is at risk when injecting anaesthetic into the deep peroneal nerve. Ultrasound can be used to help to avoid the artery. The injection site is just lateral to the artery.
