= Anatomical terms of bone =

Many anatomical terms descriptive of bone are defined in anatomical terminology, and are often derived from Greek and Latin. Bone in the human body is categorized into long bone, short bone, flat bone, irregular bone and sesamoid bone.

== Types of bone ==
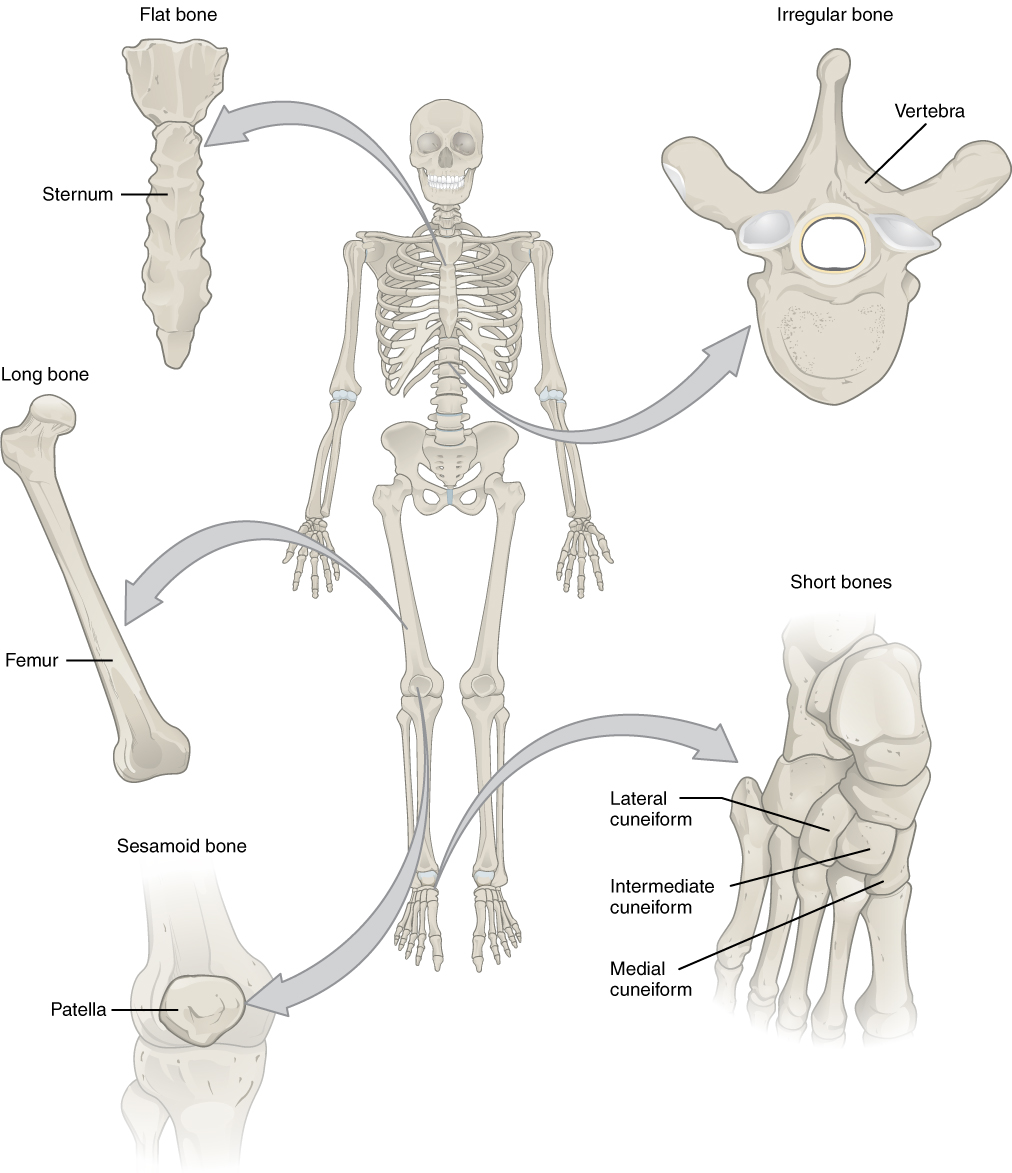
Different types of bone

=== Long bones ===
A long bone is one that is cylindrical in shape, being longer than it is wide. However, the term describes the shape of a bone, not its size, which is relative. Long bones are found in the arms (humerus, ulna, radius) and legs (femur, tibia, fibula), as well as in the fingers (metacarpals, phalanges) and toes (metatarsals, phalanges). Long bones function as levers; they move when muscles contract.

=== Short bones ===
A short bone is one that is cube-like in shape, being approximately equal in length, width, and thickness. The only short bones in the human skeleton are in the carpals of the wrists and the tarsals of the ankles. Short bones provide stability and support as well as some limited motion.

=== Flat bones ===
The term “flat bone” is something of a misnomer because, although a flat bone is typically thin, it is also often curved. Examples include the cranial (skull) bones, the scapulae (shoulder blades), the sternum (breastbone), and the ribs. Flat bones serve as points of attachment for muscles and often protect internal organs. Flat bones do not have a medullary cavity because they are thin.

=== Irregular bones ===
An irregular bone is one that does not have an easily classified shape and defies description. These bones tend to have more complex shapes, like the vertebrae that support the spinal cord and protect it from compressive forces. Many facial bones, particularly the ones containing sinuses, are classified as irregular bones.

=== Sesamoid bones ===
A sesamoid bone is a small, round bone that, as the name suggests, is shaped like a sesame seed. These bones form in tendons (the sheaths of tissue that connect bones to muscles) where a great deal of pressure is generated in a joint. The sesamoid bones protect tendons by helping them overcome compressive forces. Sesamoid bones vary in number and placement from person to person but are typically found in tendons associated with the feet, hands, and knees. The only type of sesamoid bone that is common to everybody is the kneecap (patella, pl. patellae) which is also the largest of the sesamoid bones.

== Protrusions ==
=== Rounded ===
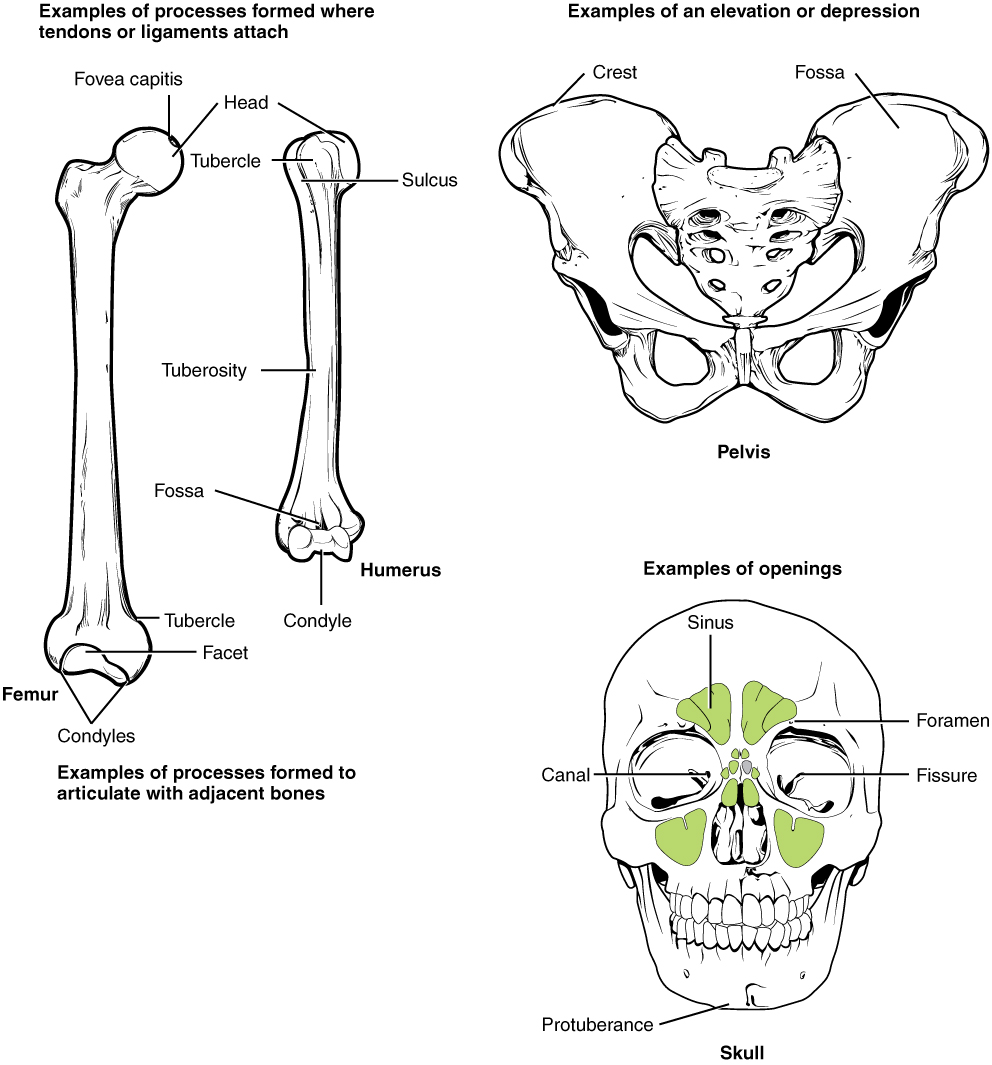
Different types of bone markings and features.

A condyle is the round prominence at the end of a bone, most often part of a joint – an articulation with another bone. The epicondyle refers to a projection near a condyle, particularly the medial epicondyle of the humerus. These terms derive from Greek. (Note: Specifically, Latin: condylus, from "knuckle" (Greek: kondylos), with "epi" referring to "Upon".)

An eminence refers to a relatively small projection or bump, particularly of bone, such as the medial eminence.

A process refers to a relatively large projection or prominent bump, as does a promontory such as the sacral promontory.

Both tubercle and tuberosity refer to a projection or bump with a roughened surface, with a "tubercle" generally smaller than a "tuberosity". These terms are derived from tuber (Latin: swelling)., as is also protuberance, which occasionally is synonymous with "tuberosity".

A ramus (Latin: branch) refers to an extension of bone, such as the ramus of the mandible in the jaw or superior pubic ramus. Ramus may also be used to refer to nerves, such as the ramus communicans.

A facet refers to a small, flattened articular surface.

=== Pointed ===
A line refers to a long, thin projection, often with a rough surface.

Ridge and crest refer to a long, narrow line. Unlike many words used to describe anatomical terms, the word ridge is derived from Old English. (Note: Specifically, 'spine, crest' (Old English:hrycg) from Germanic related to the Dutch "rug" and German "Rücken" 'back'.)

A spine, as well as referring to the spinal cord, may be used to describe a relatively long, thin projection or bump.

=== Special ===
These terms are used to describe bony protuberances in specific parts of the body.

The Malleolus (Latin: "small hammer") is the bony prominence on each side of the ankle. These are known as the medial and lateral malleolus. Each leg is supported by two bones, the tibia on the inner side (medial) of the leg and the fibula on the outer side (lateral) of the leg. The medial malleolus is the prominence on the inner side of the ankle, formed by the lower end of the tibia. The lateral malleolus is the prominence on the outer side of the ankle, formed by the lower end of the fibula.

The trochanters are parts of the femur, to which muscles attach. It may refer to the greater, lesser, or third trochanter

== Cavities ==
=== Openings ===
The following terms are used to describe cavities that connect to other areas:

A foramen is any opening, particularly referring to those in bone. Foramina inside the body of humans and other animals typically allow muscles, nerves, arteries, veins, or other structures to connect one part of the body with another. An example is the foramen magnum in occipital bone.

A canal is a long, tunnel-like foramen, usually a passage for notable nerves or blood vessels. An example is the auditory canal.

=== Blind-ended ===
The following terms are used to describe cavities that do not connect to other areas:

A fossa (from the Latin "fossa", ditch or trench) is a depression or hollow, usually in a bone, such as the hypophyseal fossa, the depression in the sphenoid bone.

A meatus is a short canal that opens to another part of the body. An example is the external auditory meatus.

A fovea (Latin: pit) is a small pit, usually on the head of a bone. An example of a fovea is the fovea capitis of the head of the femur.

=== Walls ===
The following terms are used to describe the walls of a cavity:

A labyrinth refers to the bony labyrinth and membranous labyrinth, components of the inner ear, due to their fine and complex structure.

A sinus refers to a bony cavity, usually within the skull.

== Joints ==
A joint, or articulation is the region where adjacent bones contact each other, for example the elbow, shoulder, or costovertebral joint. Terms that refer to joints include:

- articular process, referring to a projection that contacts an adjacent bone.
- suture, referring to an articulation between cranial bones.

== Features of long bones ==
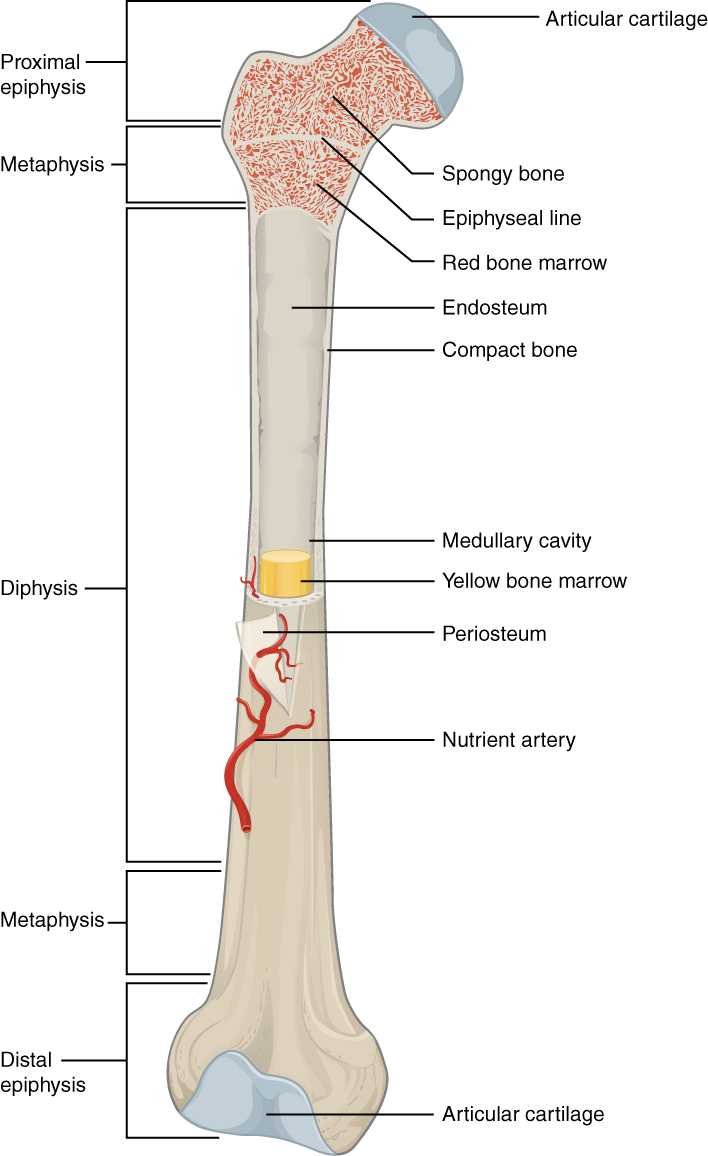
Gross overview of the features of long bones in a fully grown adult.

=== Gross features ===
Bones are commonly described with the terms head, neck, shaft, body and base.

The head of a bone usually refers to the proximal end of a long bone, but also refers to the distal end of metacarpals, metatarsals, and the ulna. The shaft refers to the elongated sections of long bone, and the neck the segment between the head and shaft (or body). The end of the long bone opposite to the head is known as the base.

=== Internal regions ===
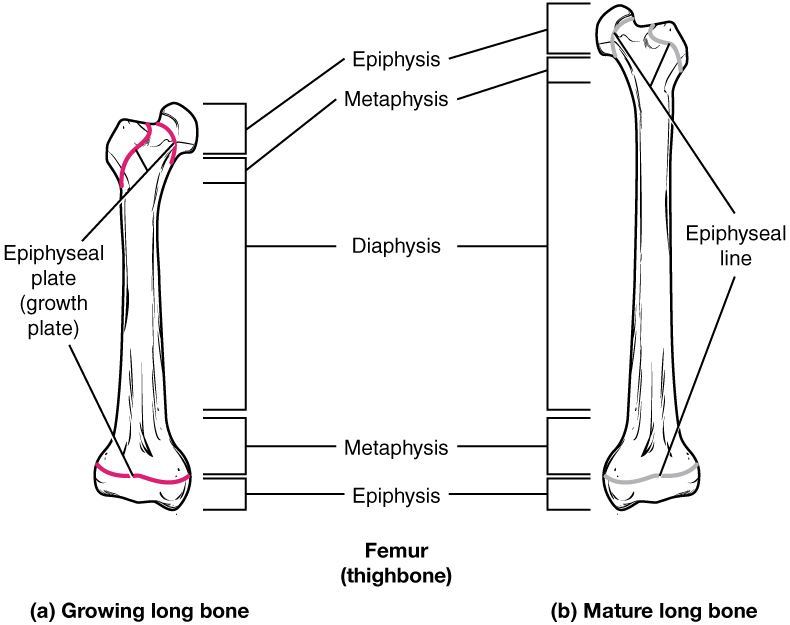
The epiphyseal plate is the area in which bone growth occurs after birth through endochondral ossification.

Bone feature	Definition	Etymologic memory aid
apophysis	Any of various processes or protuberances on a bone.	apo- + physis, "outward from the growth part; outgrowth"
diaphysis	The long, relatively straight main body of a long bone; region of primary ossification. Also known as the shaft.	dia- + physis, "between the growth parts"
epiphysis	The end regions of a long bone; regions of secondary ossification.	epi- + physis, "on top of the growth part"
physis (epiphyseal plate)	Also known as the growth plate. In a long bone it is a thin disc of hyaline cartilage that is positioned transversely between the epiphysis and metaphysis. In the long bones of humans, the epiphyseal plate disappears by twenty years of age.	physis, "the growth part"
metaphysis	The region of a long bone lying between the epiphysis and diaphysis.	meta- + physis, "the transitional part (between shaft and end) leading to the growth part"

=== Internal and external ===
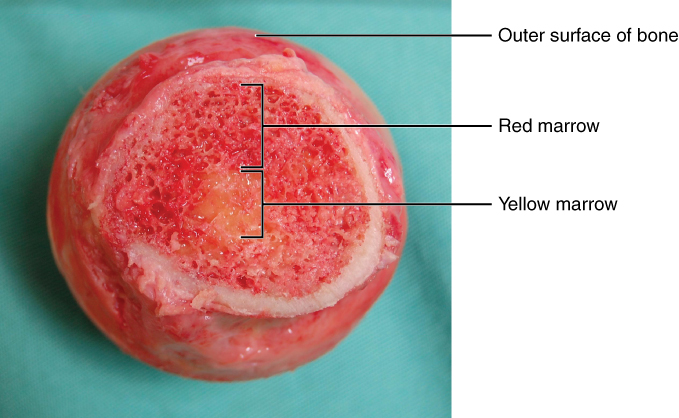
Inside of the head of femur, showing surface of the bone, red and yellow bone marrow.

The cortex of a bone is used to refer to its outer layers, and medulla used to refer to the inner surface of the bone. Red marrow, in which blood is formed is present in spongy bone as well as in the medullary cavity, while the fatty yellow marrow is present primarily in the medullary cavity.

== See also ==
- Anatomical terms of muscle
- Anatomical terminology
