= Selasia apicalis =

Scientific classification
- Kingdom: Animalia
- Phylum: Arthropoda
- Clade: Pancrustacea
- Class: Insecta
- Order: Coleoptera
- Suborder: Polyphaga
- Infraorder: Elateriformia
- Family: Elateridae
- Genus: Selasia
- Species: S. apicalis

Binomial name
- Selasia apicalis Pic, 1914

Species of beetle

Selasia apicalis, is a species of false firefly beetle found in Sri Lanka.

== Description ==
This small species of beetle has a length of about 5.15 mm.
