= Ignacy Mielżyński =

Polish noble and naturalist (1801–1831)

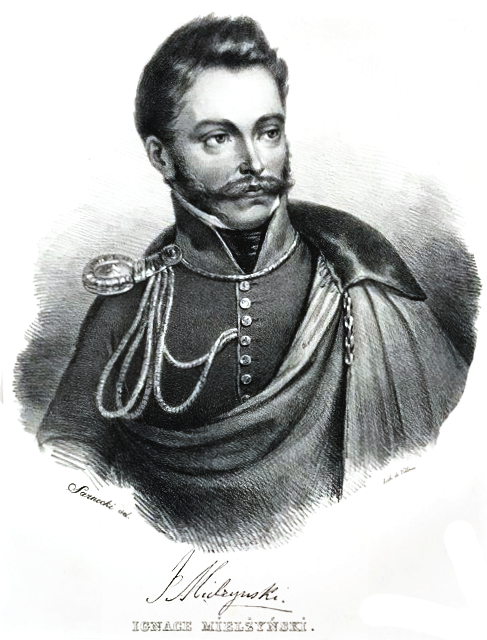

Count Ignacy Antoni Nepomucen Mielżyński (20 December 1801 – 9 July 1831) was a Polish noble and naturalist. He took a special interest in insects and described the parasitism of snails by driline beetles. Along with his brothers and family he was involved in the November Uprising of 1830 in Poland in which he was killed.

== Life and work ==
Mielżyński was born in Greater Poland to Józef Mielżyński and Franciszka Niemojowska belonging to the Mielżyński nobles. He was baptized by Father Kanty Urbański from the Ober monastery and his godparents were Andrzej Mielęcki, general and heir to the Graboszewo estate, and Miss Teodozya Niemojewska, daughter of Feliks and Aniela Niemojewski. Along with his brothers Seweryn and Maciej, he was initially educated at home and then at the College Francais in Berlin. His father then sent him and Seweryn to Geneva where he became a member of the Swiss society for natural sciences and an honorary member of the Société Helvétique de Genève. He interacted with Jean-Louis Prevost (1790–1850) and Jean-Baptiste Dumas (1800–1884). He collected snails and amber while Seweryn took an interest in painting. In 1822 he wrote a memoir on gastropods and in 1823 he wrote on a larva that parasitized the antenna of Helix nemoralis and described the larviform species that emerged as Cochleoctonus vorax thinking it was new but this was a female and the male had already been described under the name Drilus flavescens by Guillaume-Antoine Olivier (1756–1814). He dedicated his study to the Geneva naturalist Louis Albert Necker (1786–1861). Anselme Gaëtan Desmarest (1784–1838) reared more parasites and was able to determine that the forms were the males and females of D. flavescens. The political turmoil in Poland however interrupted his study and he on return, he and his brother were imprisoned for protesting the detention of his brother Maciej. They later escaped through Europe. During the insurgency of November 1830 the three brothers joined the Poznań Lancers Regiment. Seweryn was wounded in 1831. Ignace also became ill and he was killed after being captured by Russians. Ignacy died while serving as an adjutant to General Chłapowski during the battle of Szawły in Samogitia but the family was unaware of his death and the family spent many years hoping that he was alive somewhere in Siberia. Maciej was the oldest surviving brother.
