= Selasia isabellae =

Scientific classification
- Kingdom: Animalia
- Phylum: Arthropoda
- Class: Insecta
- Order: Coleoptera
- Suborder: Polyphaga
- Infraorder: Elateriformia
- Family: Elateridae
- Genus: Selasia
- Species: S. isabellae

Binomial name
- Selasia isabellae Bourgeois, 1909

Species of beetle

Selasia isabellae, is a species of false firefly beetle found in Sri Lanka.
