= Selasia =

Scientific classification
- Domain: Eukaryota
- Kingdom: Animalia
- Phylum: Arthropoda
- Class: Insecta
- Order: Coleoptera
- Suborder: Polyphaga
- Infraorder: Elateriformia
- Family: Elateridae
- Subfamily: Agrypninae
- Tribe: Drilini
- Genus: Selasia; Laporte, 1836

Genus of beetles

Selasia is a genus of beetles belonging to the family Elateridae, having historically been placed in the family "Drilidae", which was recently subsumed by Elateridae.

== List of species ==
- Selasia apicalis Pic, 1914
- Selasia arabica Geisthardt, 2003
- Selasia atriventris Pic, 1914
- Selasia boruckae Kundrata, 2012
- Selasia dembickyi Kundrata & Sormova, 2018
- Selasia homhilia Geisthardt, 2003
- Selasia isabellae Bourgeois, 1909
- Selasia ivanae Packova & Kundrata, 2021
- Selasia jenisi Kundrata & Sormova, 2018
- Selasia merkli Kundrata, 2012
- Selasia nigrobrunnea Kundrata, 2017
- Selasia pallida Péringuey
- Selasia sabatinellii Kundrata, 2017
- Selasia socotrana Kundrata, 2012
- Selasia unicolor (Guérin-Méneville)
