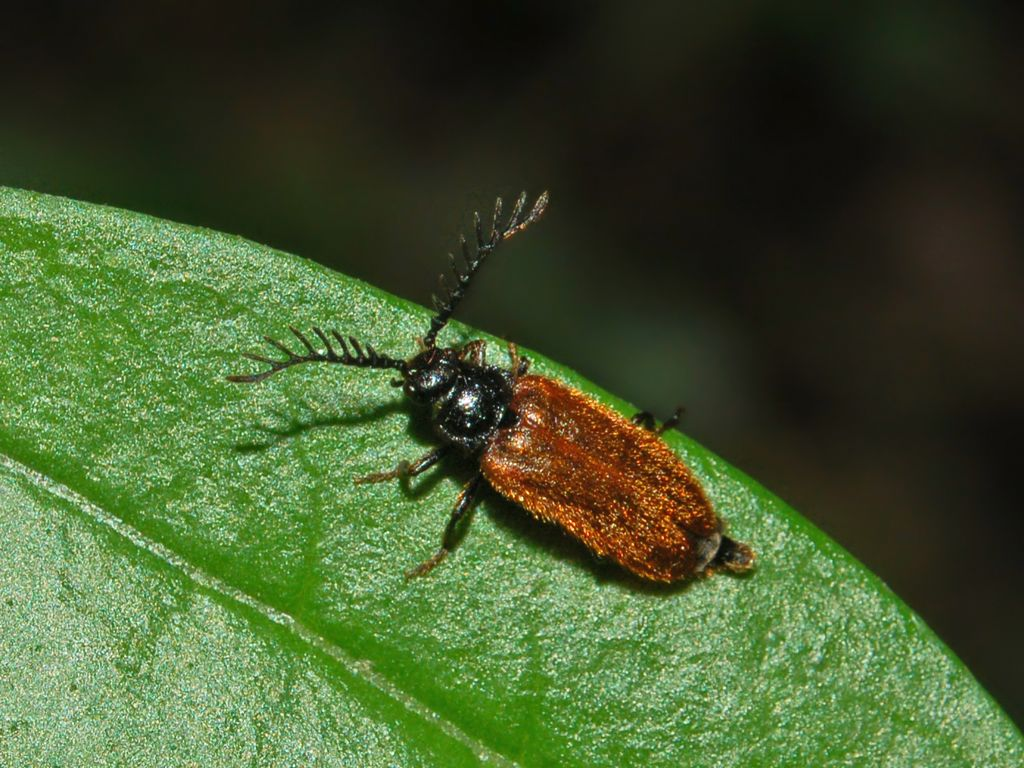
- Drilus flavescens - Male

Scientific classification
- Domain: Eukaryota
- Kingdom: Animalia
- Phylum: Arthropoda
- Class: Insecta
- Order: Coleoptera
- Suborder: Polyphaga
- Infraorder: Elateriformia
- Family: Elateridae
- Subfamily: Agrypninae
- Tribe: Drilini
- Genus: Drilus; Olivier, 1790

= Drilus =

Genus of beetles

Drilus is a genus of beetles belonging to the family Elateridae.

== List of species ==
- Drilus amabilis Schaufuss, 1867
- Drilus atripennis Pic, 1934
- Drilus attenuatus Pic, 1914
- Drilus basilewskyi Wittmer, 1962
- Drilus bicolor Schaufuss, 1867
- Drilus concolor Ahrens, 1812
- Drilus creticus Pic, 1905
- Drilus distincticollis Pic, 1907
- Drilus flavescens Olivier, 1790
- Drilus frontalis Schaufuss, 1867
- Drilus fulvicollis Audouin, 1824
- Drilus fulvicornis Kiesenwetter, 1859
- Drilus fulvitarsis Baudi di Selve, 1871
- Drilus funebris Reitter, 1894
- Drilus humeralis Pic, 1931
- Drilus iljini Barovskij, 1922
- Drilus impressiceps Pic, 1913
- Drilus iranicus Wittmer, 1967
- Drilus kandyanus Bourgeois, 1903
- Drilus latithorax Pic, 1902
- Drilus longulus Kiesenwetter, 1859
- Drilus mauritanicus Lucas, 1842
- Drilus novoathonius Sumakow, 1903
- Drilus obscuricornis Pic, 1899
- Drilus posticus Schaufuss, 1867
- Drilus ramosus Fairmaire, 1883
- Drilus rectus Schaufuss, 1867
- Drilus rufipes (Baudi, 1871)
- Drilus schwarzi Reitter, 1891
- Drilus striatus Pic, 1929
- Drilus testaceipennis Pic, 1918
- Drilus testaceipes Pic, 1933
- Drilus truquii (Baudi di Selve, 1871)

== Gallery ==
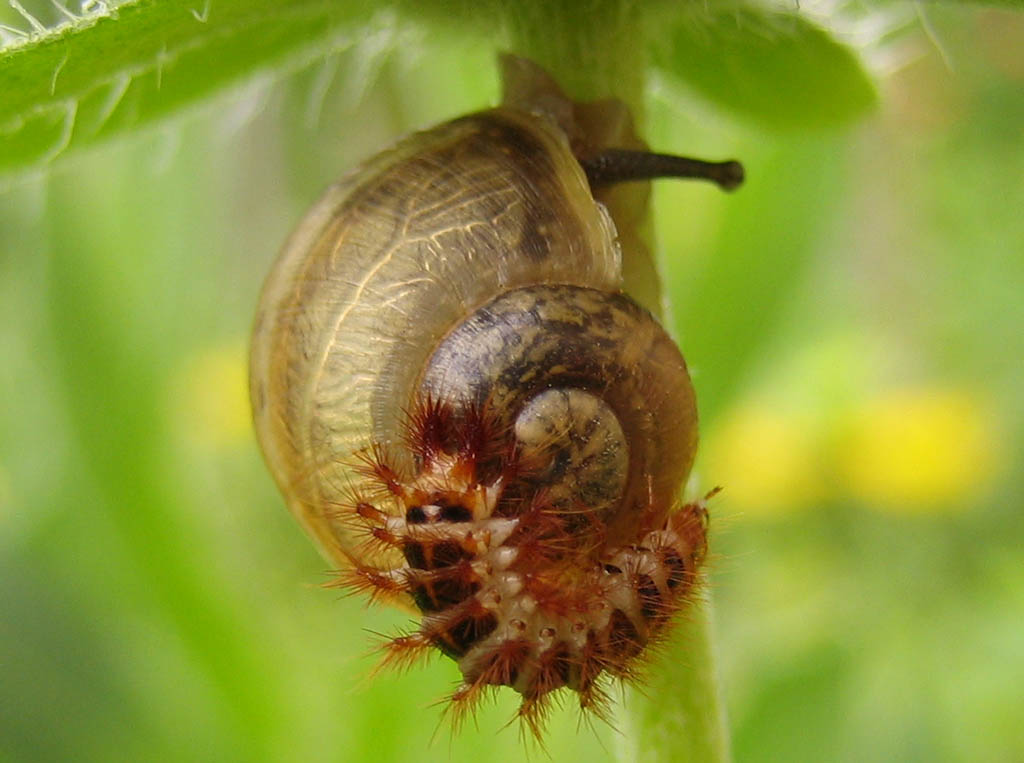
Larva of Drilus sp. preying a stylommatophoran snail
