= Short bone =

Bones that are as wide as they are long

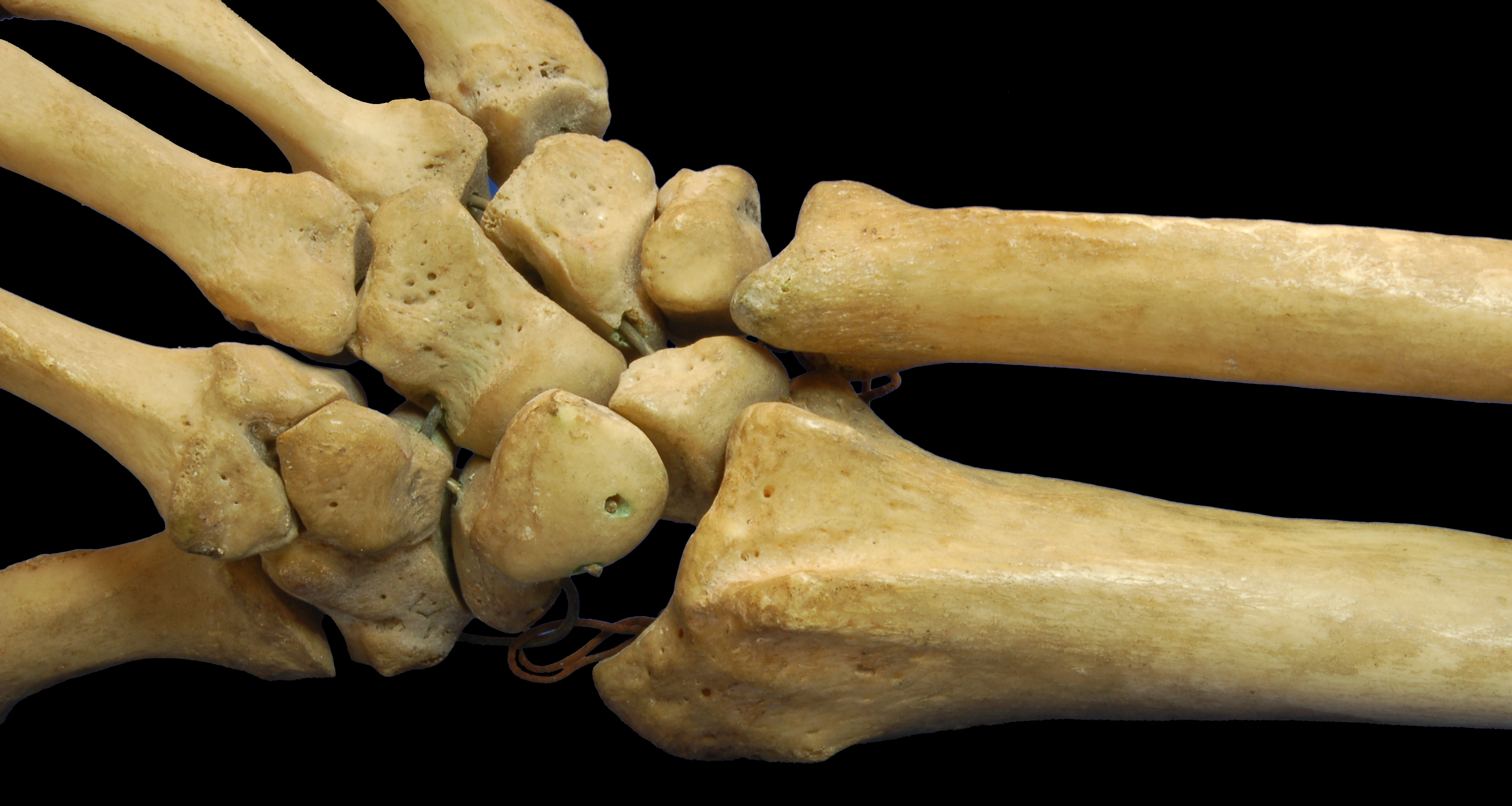
- Carpus (bones of wrist) is classified as short bone.

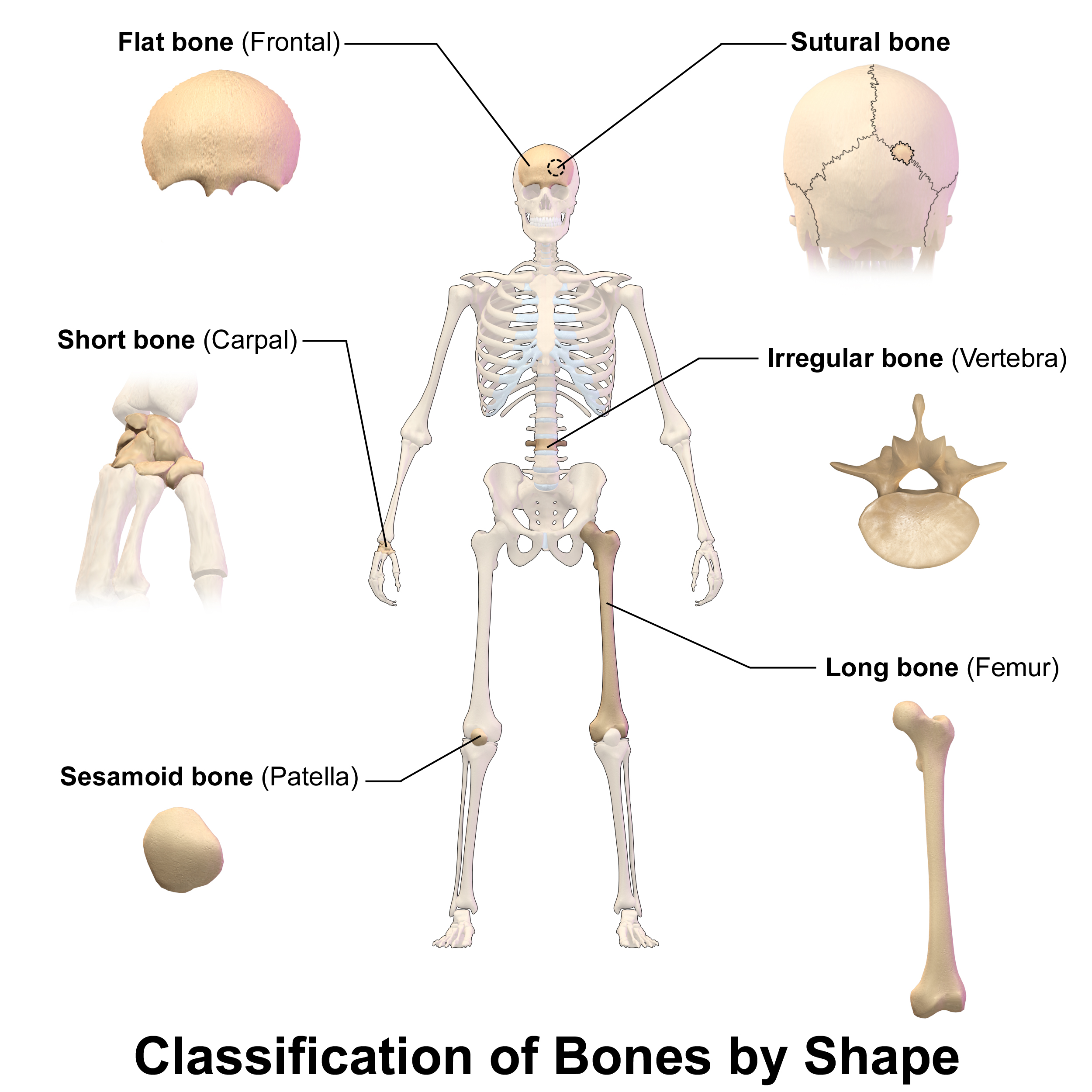

Details

Identifiers
- Latin: os breve
- TA98: A02.0.00.012
- TA2: 370
- FMA: 7475

Short bones are designated as those bones that are more or less equal in length, width, and thickness. They include the tarsals in the ankle and the carpals in the wrist. They are one of five types of bones: short, long, flat, irregular and sesamoid. Most short bones are named according to their shape as they exhibit a variety of complex morphological features (They can be cuboid, lenticular, trapezoidal, etc.)

Some authors state that short bones are only located in the carpals and tarsals. The metacarpals, metatarsals and phalanges are considered long bones as they have a shaft (tubular diaphysis), but since they're smaller than typical long bones, they're called "miniature, small or short" long bones. Nevertheless, others consider the patellae and other sesamoid bones, the vertebral bodies, the bones of the skull base and even the phalanges to be short bones.

== Structure ==
The carpus and tarsus consist of cancellous tissue covered by a thin crust of compact substance. Short bones are specialized to provide support in areas of the skeleton that are subjected to high forces or need to be very compact and where strength and stability are more important than range of motion. Short bones are characterized by their multiple articular surfaces and their tendency to form movable joints with adjacent bones. The articular surfaces of short bones are covered with hyaline cartilage, similar to long bones. The outer surface of the bone, except for the articular surfaces, is covered by the periosteum. Short bones have no clear diaphysis (bone shaft) and metaphysis and have poor vascular supply.

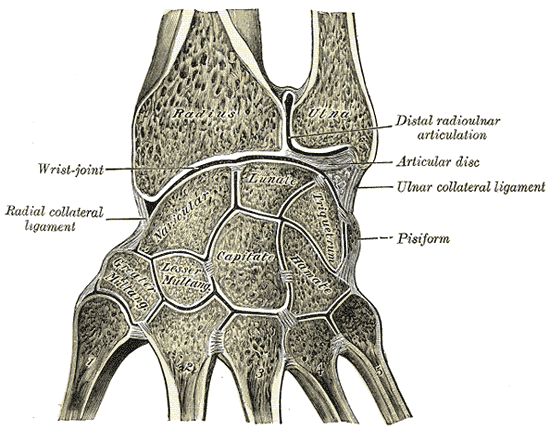
Section through the human wrist showing the cancellous bone of the carpals and the absence of diaphysis compared to the long metacarpal bones.

== Development ==
Both short and long bones undergo endochondral ossification during development. In this process, bone is formed from an initial cartilaginous model and this model is then gradually replaced by bone. Despite sharing a common cellular origin, short and long bones have different structural features.

Long bones have epiphyseal growth plates, where chondrocytes, stacked on top of each other, form longitudinal columns that are responsible for longitudinal growth of the bone. Long bones also have secondary ossification centers, in which cell columns are arranged in a radial pattern from the center like spokes on a wheel and cartilage-to-bone replacement starts in the center and extends centrifugally outwards.

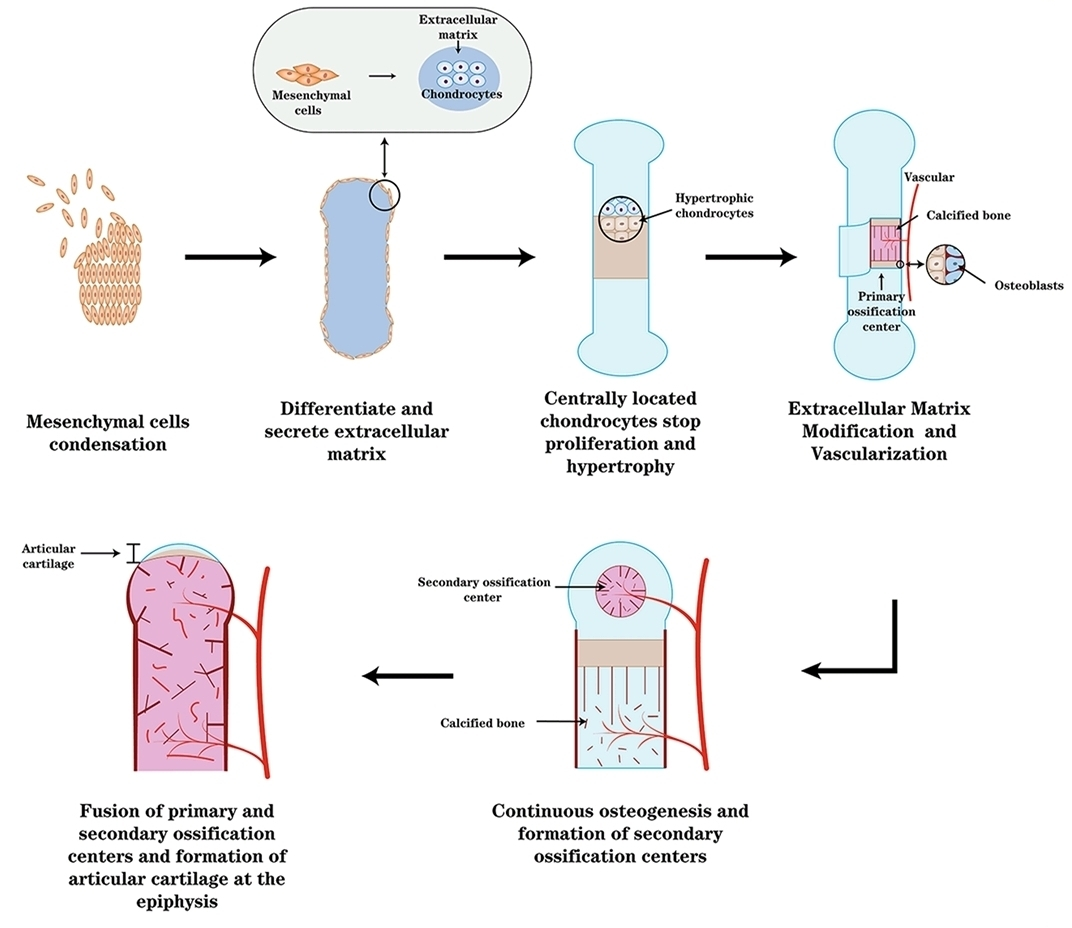
A schematic representation of endochondral ossification highlights the formation of both primary and secondary ossification centers. In the upper right region, the primary center reveals longitudinally arranged cell columns, while the lower right region showcases the secondary center, characterized by radially oriented cell columns.

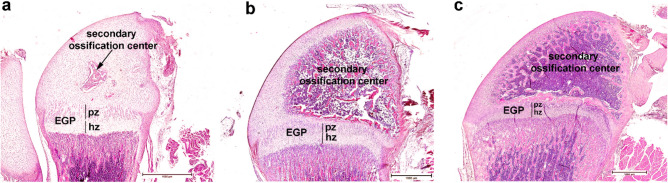
Radial expansion of the secondary ossification center is evident in this micrograph, contrasting with the vertically aligned cell columns within the epiphyseal growth plate (EGP). The proliferative zone (pz) and hypertrophic/calcification zone (hz) are clearly discernible within the EGP. Hematoxylin and eosin (HE) staining; scale bar, 1000 μm.

Contrary to long bones, the carpals and tarsals typically lack epiphyseal growth plates, hence lacking longitudinal growth and they undergo ossification radially, similar to secondary ossification centers in long bones. As a result, short bones usually develop from a single ossification nucleus, while long bones usually develop from multiple ossification nuclei.

== Clinical significance ==
Short bones are more prone to nonunion, malunion or osteonecrosis in case of fractures due to their tenuous vascular supply leading to lower healing potential. In contrast, the mid-diaphysis of the femur has a robust vascular supply from the surrounding muscle, and typically heals relatively quickly and reliably. This risk of diminished healing of short bone fractures increases in diabetic patients, probably due to diabetic peripheral neuropathy and microvascular dysfunction.
