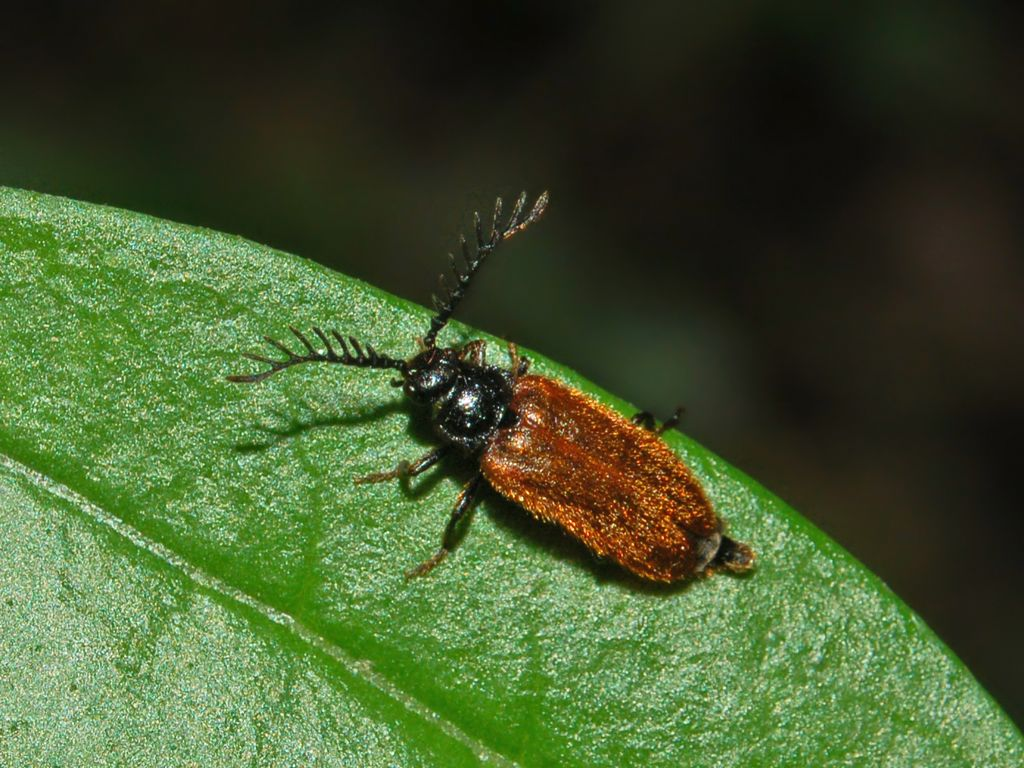
- Drilus flavescens - Male
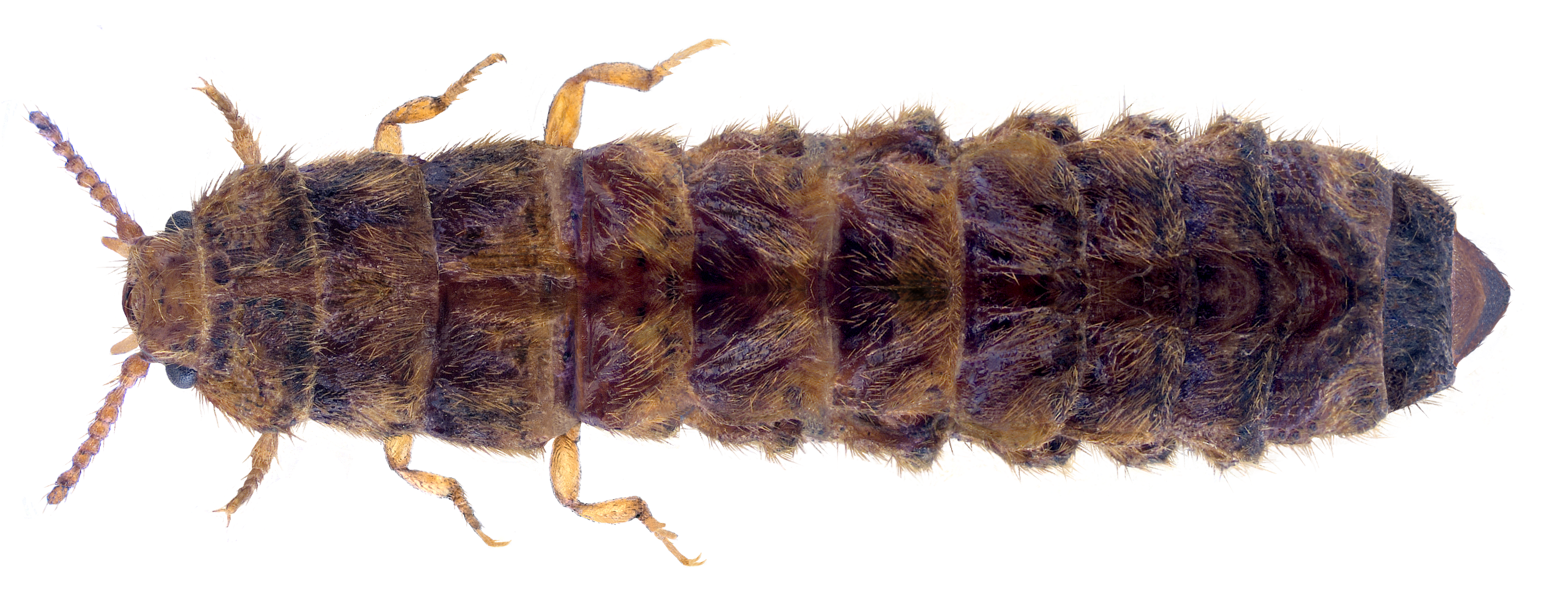
- Drilus flavescens - Female

Scientific classification
- Kingdom: Animalia
- Phylum: Arthropoda
- Clade: Pancrustacea
- Class: Insecta
- Order: Coleoptera
- Suborder: Polyphaga
- Infraorder: Elateriformia
- Family: Elateridae
- Genus: Drilus
- Species: D. flavescens

Binomial name
- Drilus flavescens Olivier, 1790

Synonyms
- Cantharis serraticornis Marshal, 1802; Cochleoctonus vorax Mielzinsky, 1824; Drilus flabellatus Kiesenwetter, 1859); Drilus parisinus Thunberg, 1792

= Drilus flavescens =

Species of beetle

Drilus flavescens is a species of beetle belonging to the family Elateridae.

== Distribution ==
This insect is mainly present in Austria, Belgium, Luxembourg, France, Italy, Spain, Germany and Switzerland.

== Description ==
Drilus flavescens is one of the most extreme cases of sexual dimorphism in insects. The females of this beetle look like a caterpillar – so called larviform females – completely lacking wings and other adult characters.

Adult males are approximately 10 millimetres (0.39 in) long. They have long comb-shaped antennas, probably utilized for detecting pheromones of females. Head and pronotum are black, while elytra are reddish, quite soft and covered of fine upstanding hairs.

== Biology ==
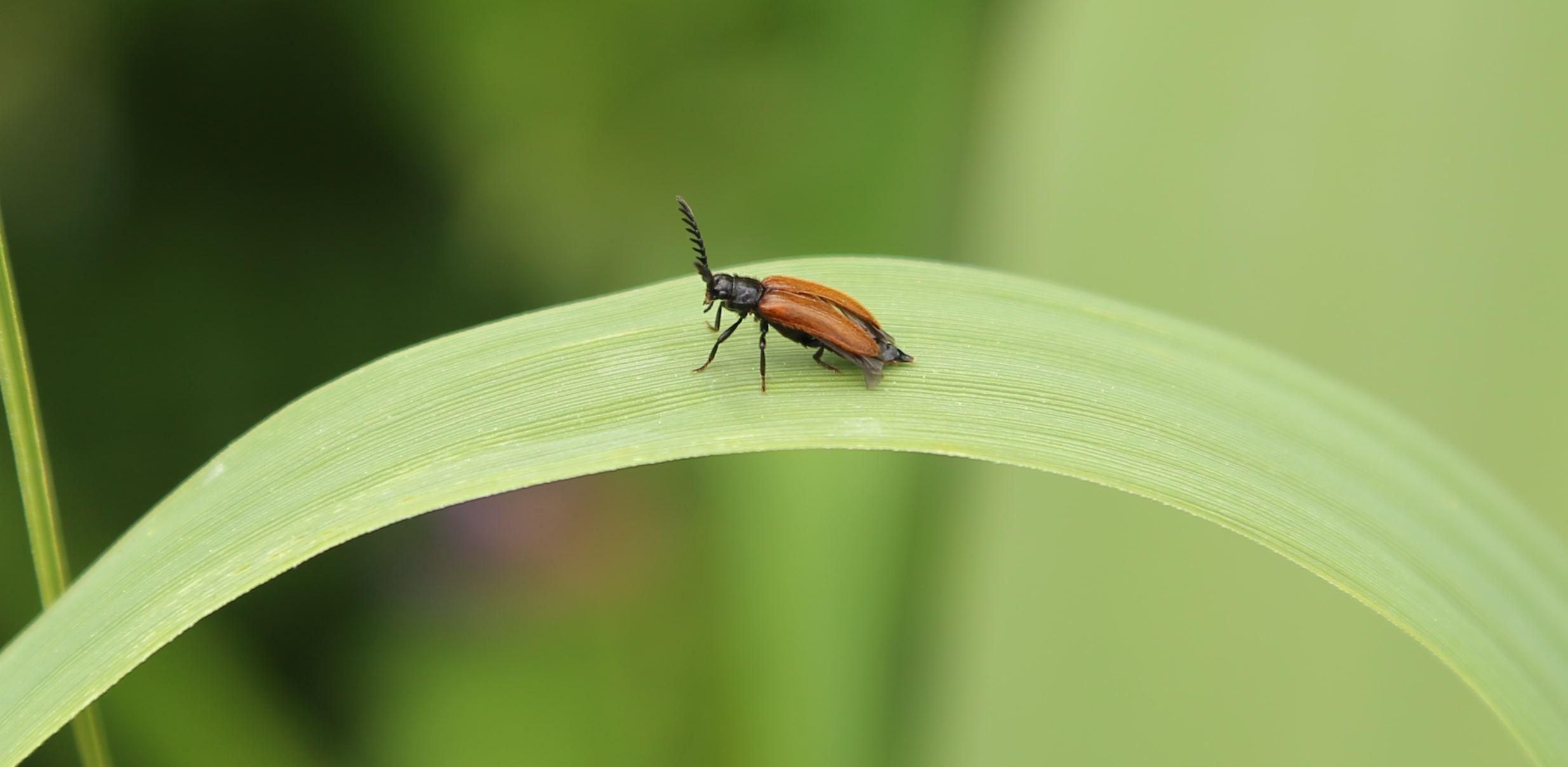
Drilus flavescens - male on an Arundo donax plant

Adult males of these insects can be encountered on flowers and foliage. Female live on the ground and can be encountered in the shells of snails (frequently Fruticicola fruticum [O. F. Müller, 1774]), feeding on the inhabitants, previously killed with a poisonous bite and sucked up with the help of digestive enzymes.

The eggs are laid in the soil under the litter and the young larvae of this beetle are covered with hairs. They are predators of terrestrial snails. Upon reaching maximum size (about 20 mm) the larva seeks out a snail shell in which to pupate. By clinging to a snail's shell via the suction cup on the terminal segment of the abdomen, the larva then bites the snail, injecting paralyzing venom that liquefies the snail's flesh with digestive enzymes. The flesh of the snail is then soft enough for the larva to burrow through the snail and enter the shell. Once installed, the larva undergoes hypermetamorphosis; the legs are reduced and the hair largely disappears. This secondary larva will overwinter in the snail shell before pupating.
