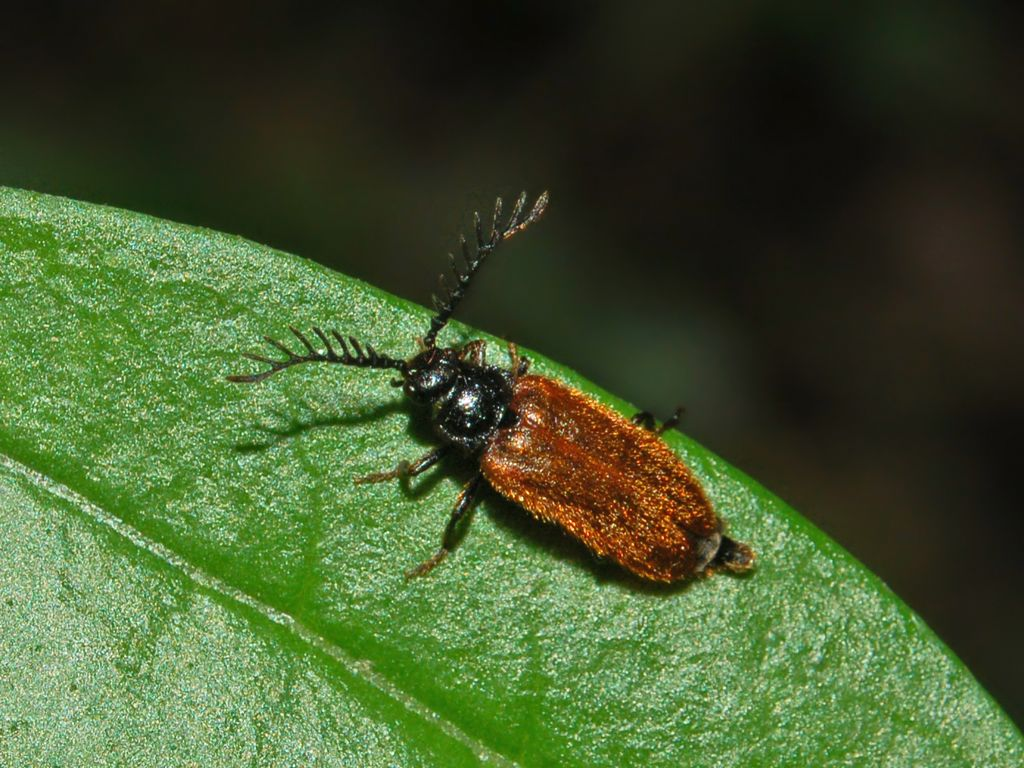
- Drilus flavescens (male)

Scientific classification
- Kingdom: Animalia
- Phylum: Arthropoda
- Clade: Pancrustacea
- Class: Insecta
- Order: Coleoptera
- Suborder: Polyphaga
- Infraorder: Elateriformia
- Family: Elateridae
- Subfamily: Agrypninae
- Tribe: Drilini; Blanchard, 1845

Genera
- Drilus Olivier, 1790; Malacogaster Bassi, 1833; Selasia Laporte, 1836

= Drilini =

Family of beetles

Drilini is a tribe of beetles known commonly as the false firefly beetles, in the family Elateridae.

== Biology ==
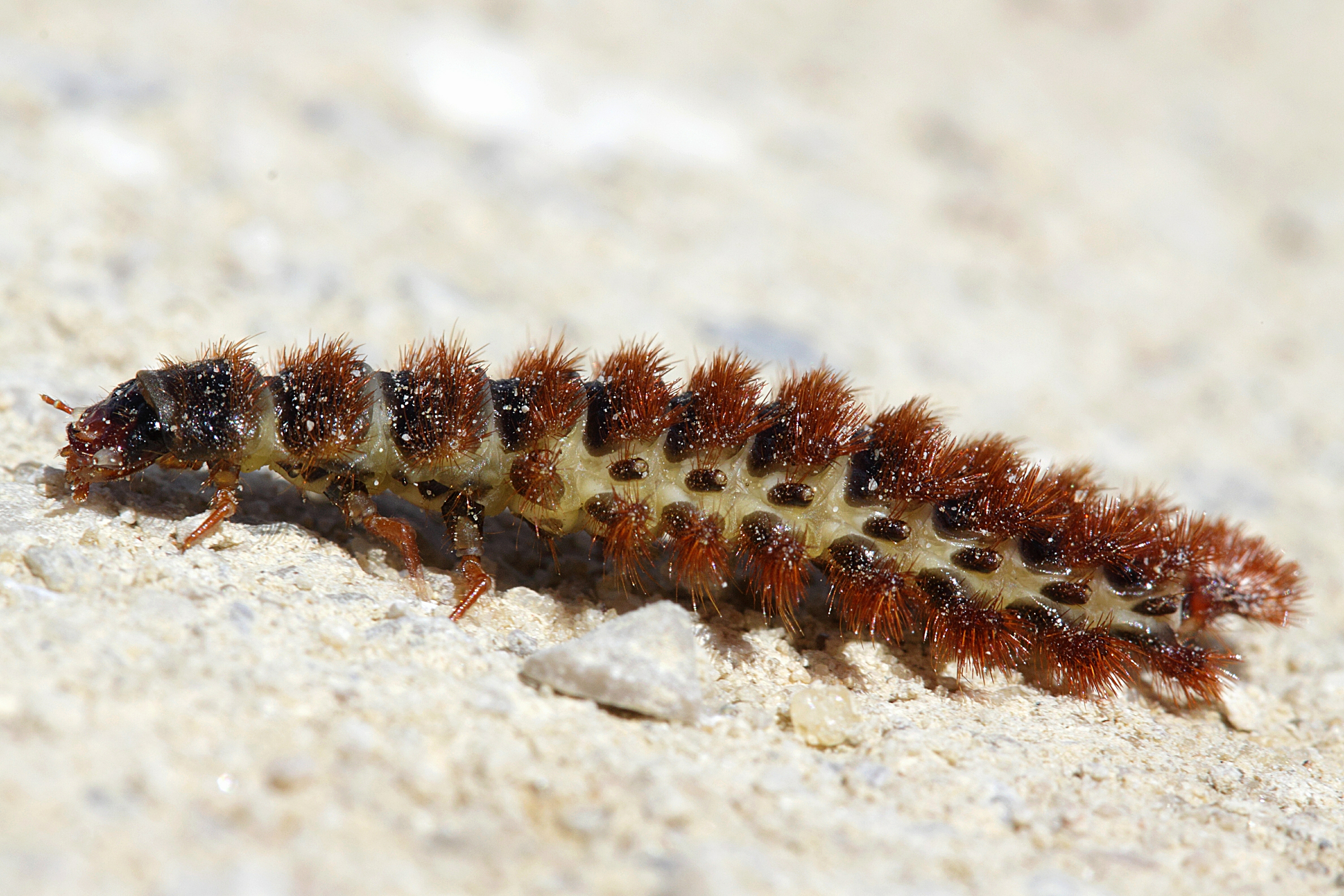
Drilus larva

Adults of drilines are sexually dimorphic. Driline larvae feed on land snails, and are covered with bristly protuberances, unlike other types of elaterid larvae.

== Systematics ==
Drilini were historically treated as a family ("Drilidae"), but evidence began accumulating that the group might actually belong in Elateridae. In 2011, analyses revealed them as nested among Agrypninae in Elateridae, and the group was transferred to the family Elateridae as the tribe Drilini. Some genera, such as Pseudeuanoma and Euanoma, were moved to the click beetle subfamily Omalisinae.

A 2019 study presented the first densely sampled molecular phylogeny of Drilini based on nuclear and mitochondrial markers, recovering 5 major clades well supported by morphology along with several new genera and species.
