= Irregular bone =

Bone of irregular shape

Irregular square
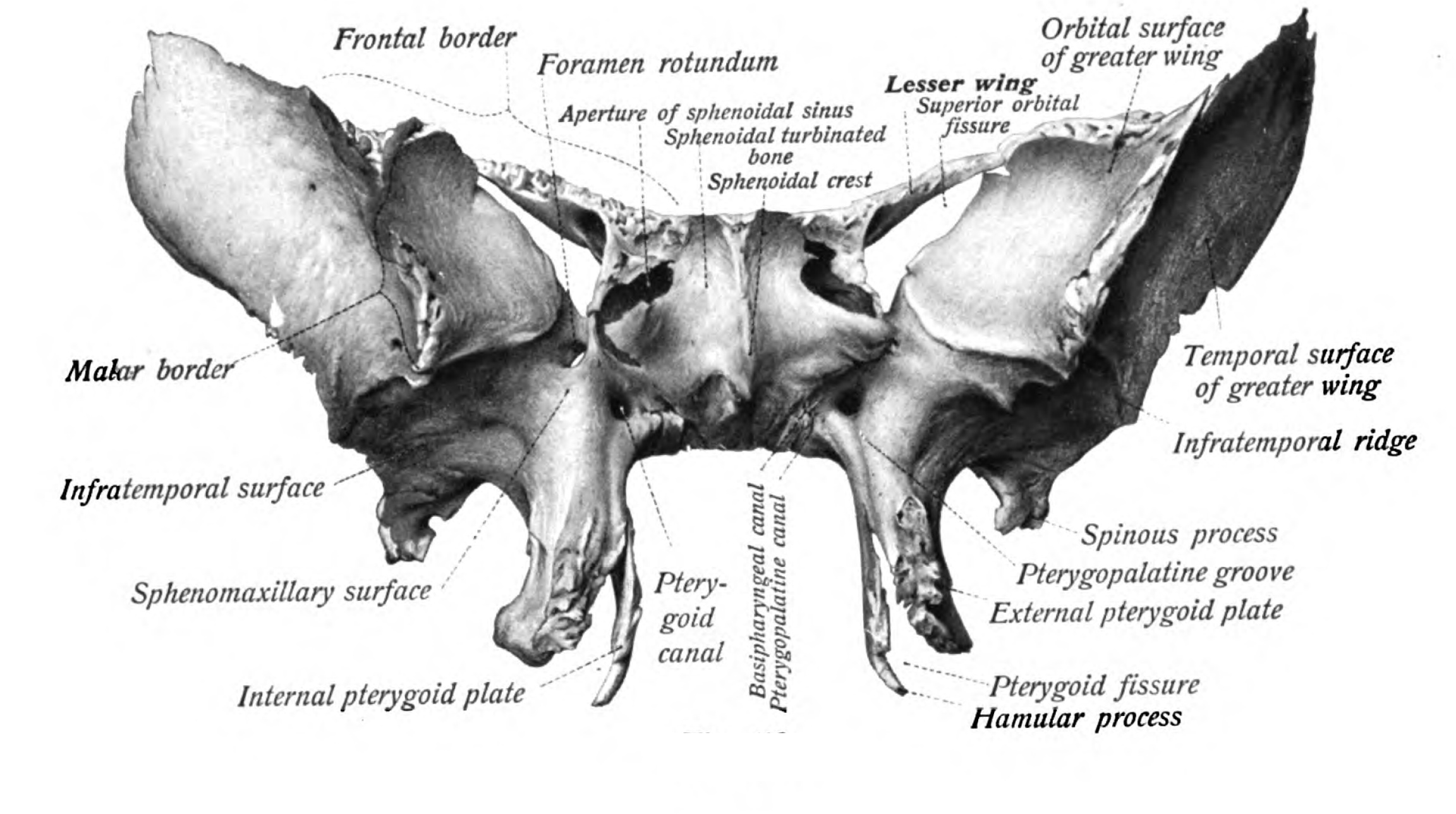
- Sphenoid bone, one of the most complex bones of the human body, is classified as irregular bone.

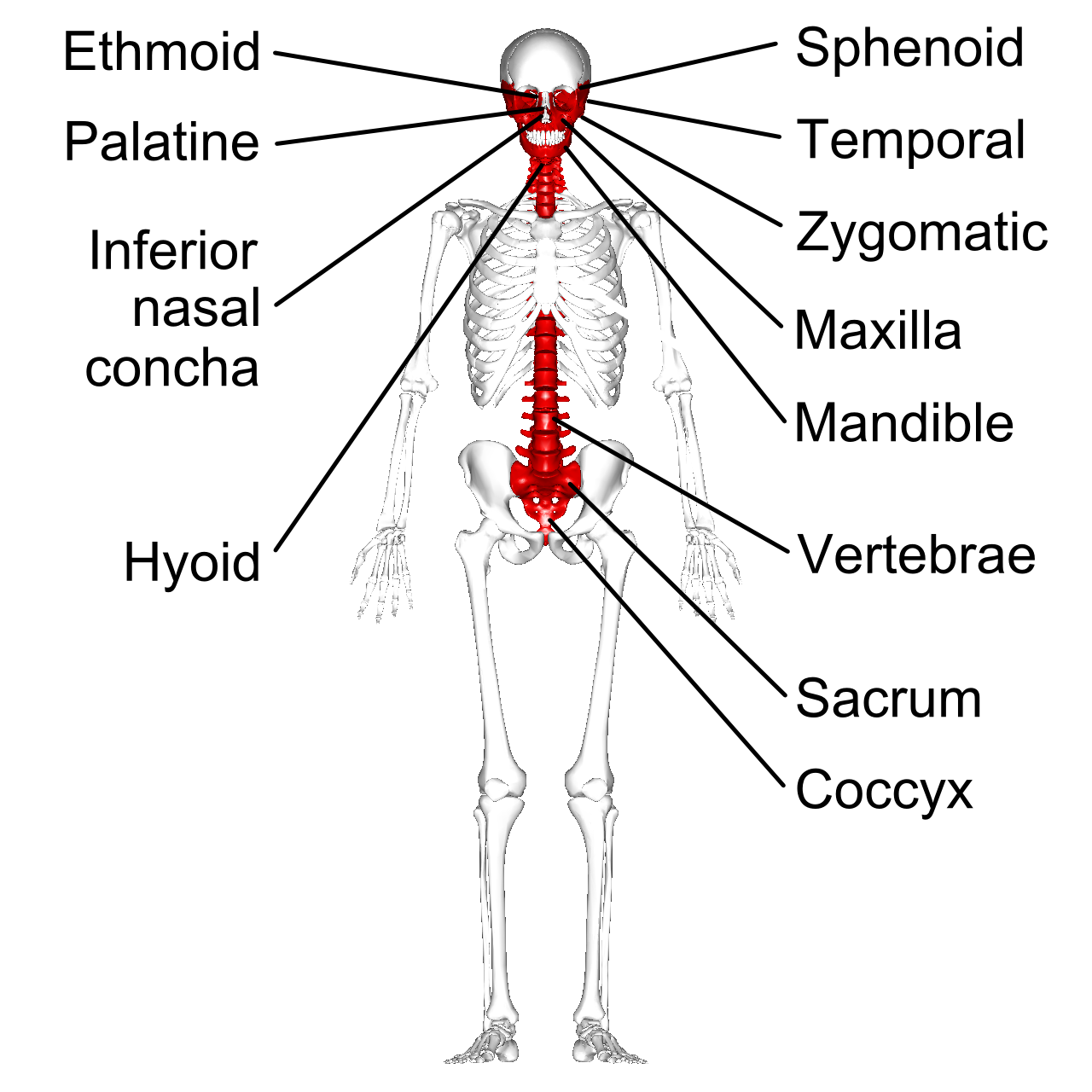
- Irregular bones in human skeleton. (shown in red).

Details

Identifiers
- Latin: os irregulare
- TA98: A02.0.00.014
- TA2: 372
- FMA: 7477

The irregular bones are bones which, from their peculiar form, cannot be grouped as long, short, flat or sesamoid bones. Irregular bones serve various purposes in the body, such as protection of nervous tissue (such as the vertebrae protect the spinal cord), affording multiple anchor points for skeletal muscle attachment (as with the sacrum), and maintaining pharynx and trachea support, and tongue attachment (such as the hyoid bone). They consist of cancellous tissue enclosed within a thin layer of compact bone. Irregular bones can also be used for joining all parts of the spinal column together. The spine is the place in the human body where the most irregular bones can be found. There are, in all, 33 irregular bones found here.

The irregular bones in the human body include the vertebrae, sacrum, coccyx, temporal, sphenoid, ethmoid, zygomatic, maxilla, mandible, palatine, inferior nasal concha, ossicles (malleus, incus, and stapes), and hyoid.

== Additional images ==
Irregular bones in human skeleton. (shown in red).

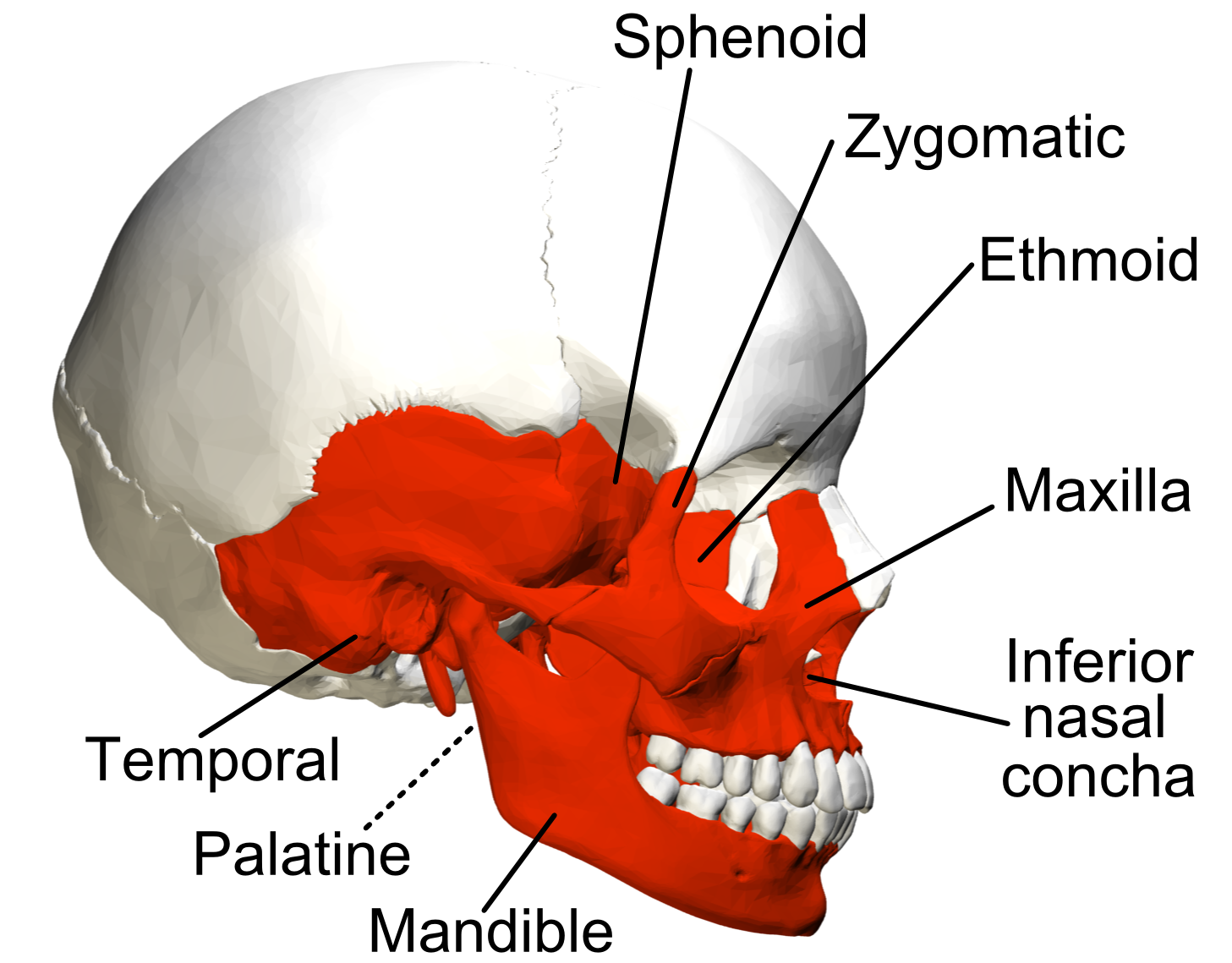
Irregular bones in human skull. (shown in red)

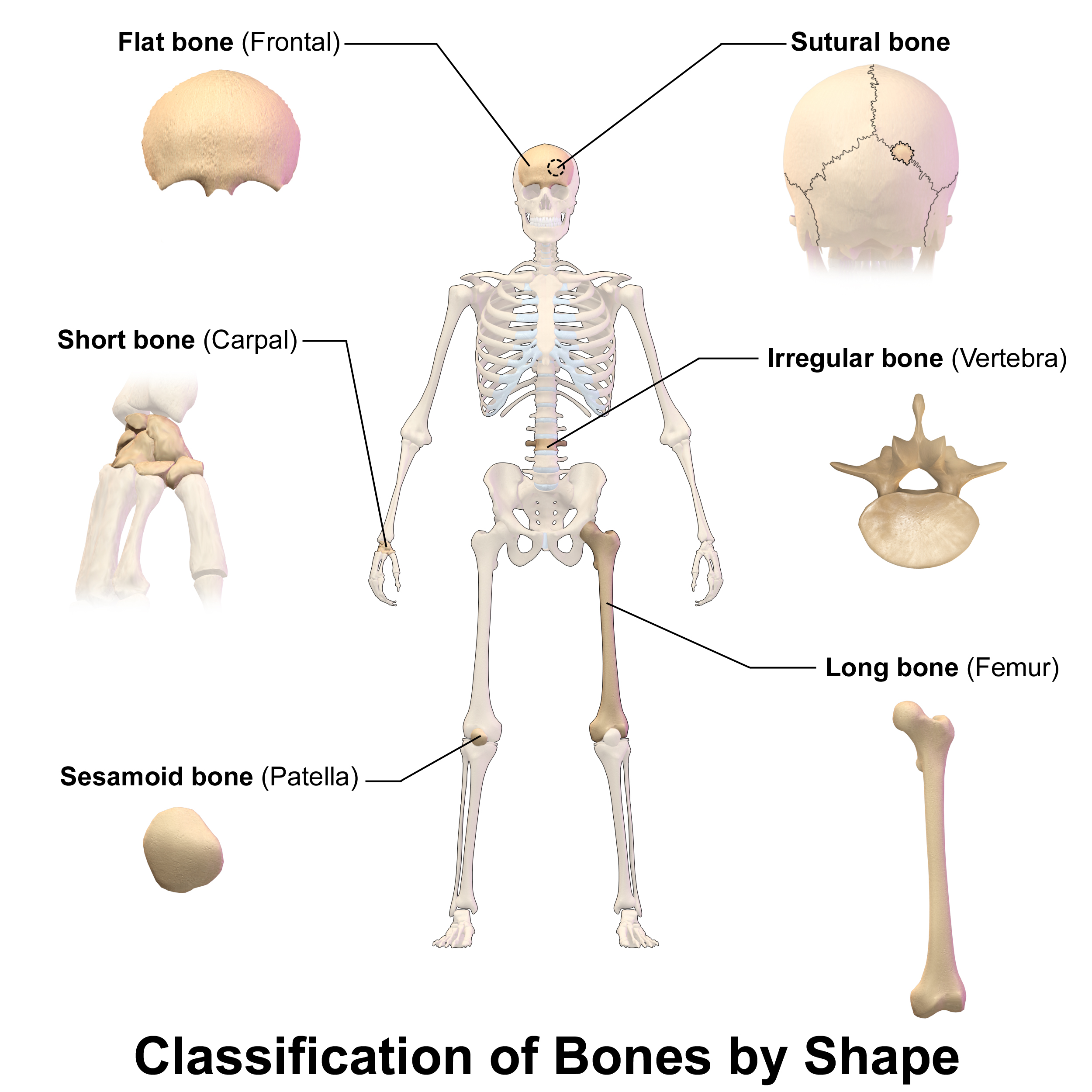
Classification of bones by shape.
