= Protuberance =

Protuberance may refer to:

- Mental protuberance
- Occipital protuberances, of which may refer to
  - Internal occipital protuberance
  - External occipital protuberance
- Laryngeal protuberance, also known as Adam's apple

== See also ==
- Anatomical terms of bone § Protrusions, including tubercle, tuberosity, and others
- Protrusion
