= Long bone =

Bone that is longer than it is wide

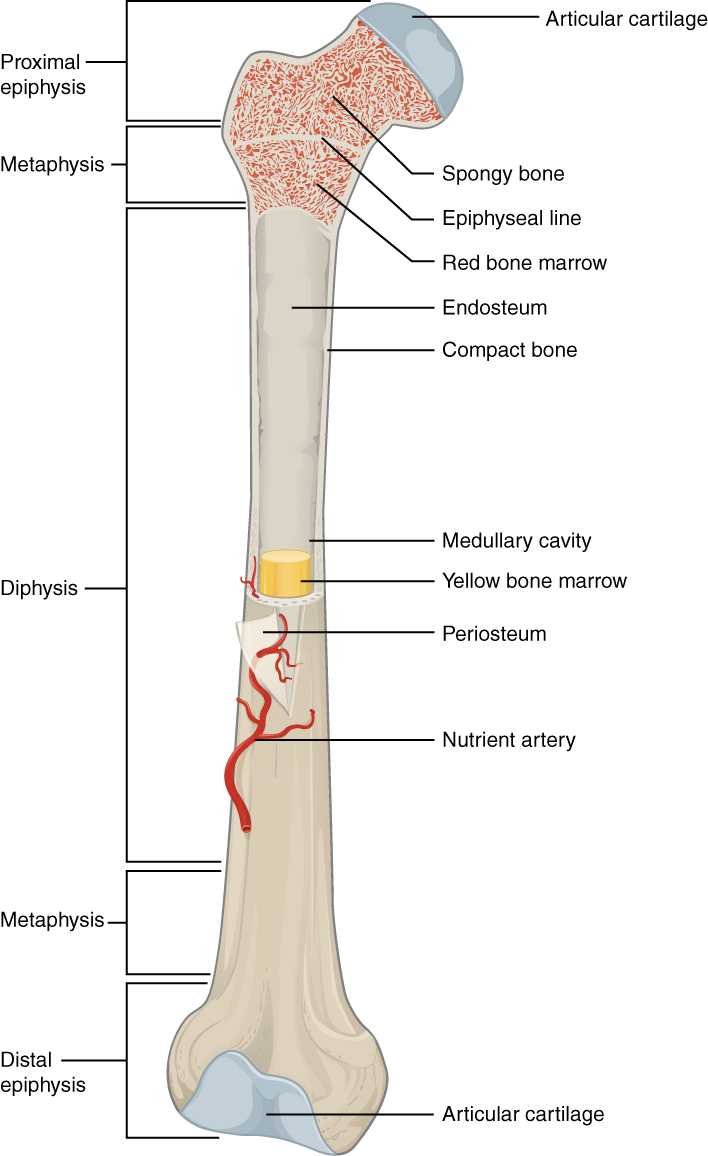
- Structure of a long bone (femur)

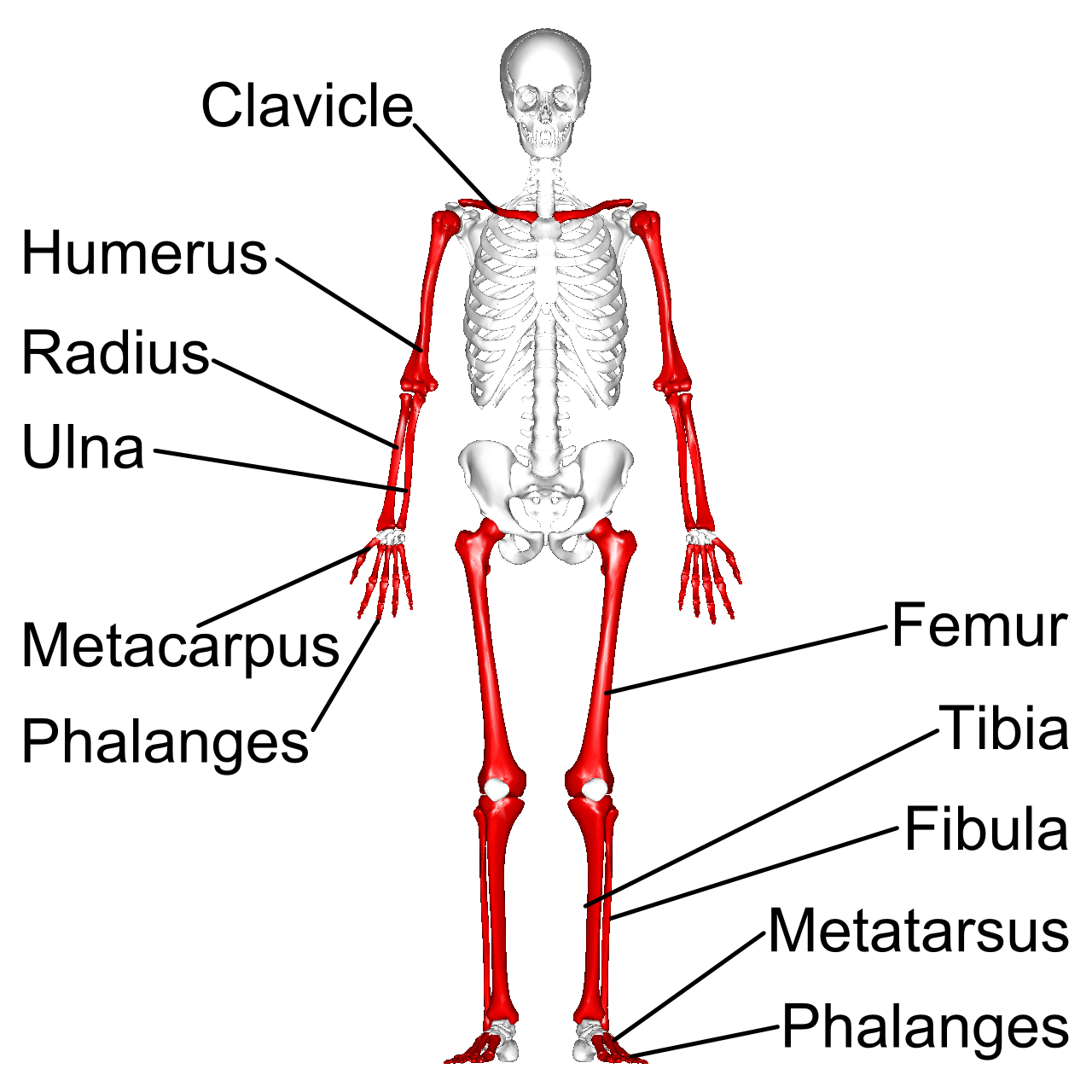
- Long bones in human skeleton (shown in red)

Details

Identifiers
- Latin: os longum
- TA98: A02.0.00.011
- TA2: 369
- FMA: 7474

The long bones are those that are longer than they are wide. They are one of five types of bones: long, short, flat, irregular and sesamoid. Long bones, especially the femur and tibia, are subjected to most of the load during daily activities and they are crucial for skeletal mobility. They grow primarily by elongation of the diaphysis, with an epiphysis at each end of the growing bone. The ends of epiphyses are covered with hyaline cartilage ("articular cartilage"). The longitudinal growth of long bones is a result of endochondral ossification at the epiphyseal plate. Bone growth in length is stimulated by the production of growth hormone (GH), a secretion of the anterior lobe of the pituitary gland.

The long bone category includes the femora, tibiae, and fibulae of the legs; the humeri, radii, and ulnae of the arms; metacarpals and metatarsals of the hands and feet, the phalanges of the fingers and toes, and the clavicles or collar bones. The long bones of the human leg make up nearly half of adult height. The other primary skeletal component of height are the vertebrae and skull.

The outside of the bone consists of a layer of connective tissue called the periosteum. Additionally, the outer shell of the long bone is compact bone, then a deeper layer of cancellous bone (spongy bone) which contains in the medullary cavity the bone marrow.

== Structure ==
The outer shell of the long bone is made of cortical bone also known as compact bone. This is covered by a membrane of connective tissue called the periosteum. Beneath the cortical bone layer is a layer of spongy cancellous bone. Inside this is the medullary cavity which has an inner core of bone marrow, it contains nutrients and help in formation of cells, made up of yellow marrow in the adult and red marrow in the child.

Long bones in human skeleton (shown in red)

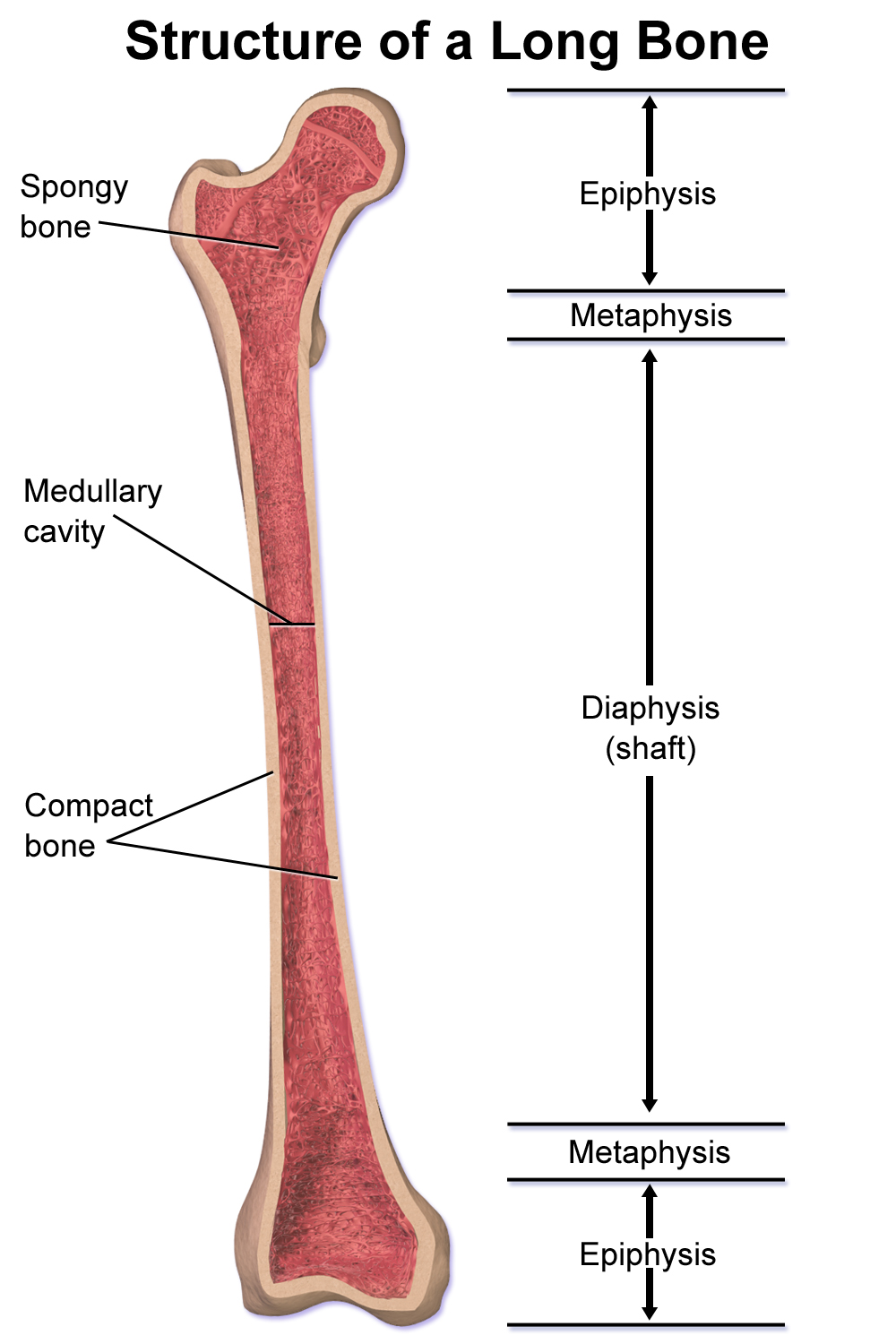
Parts of a long bone (Femur)

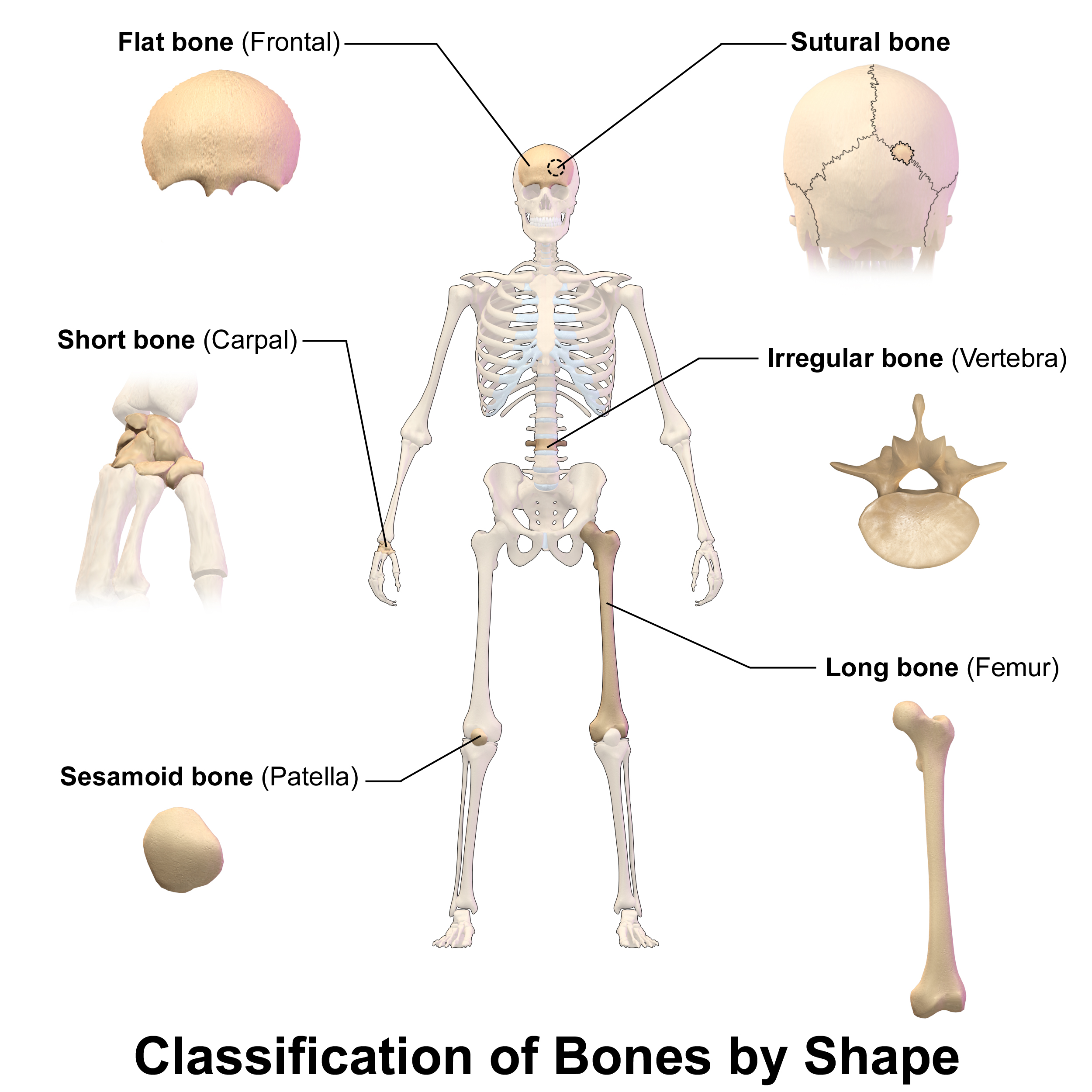
Classification of bones by shape

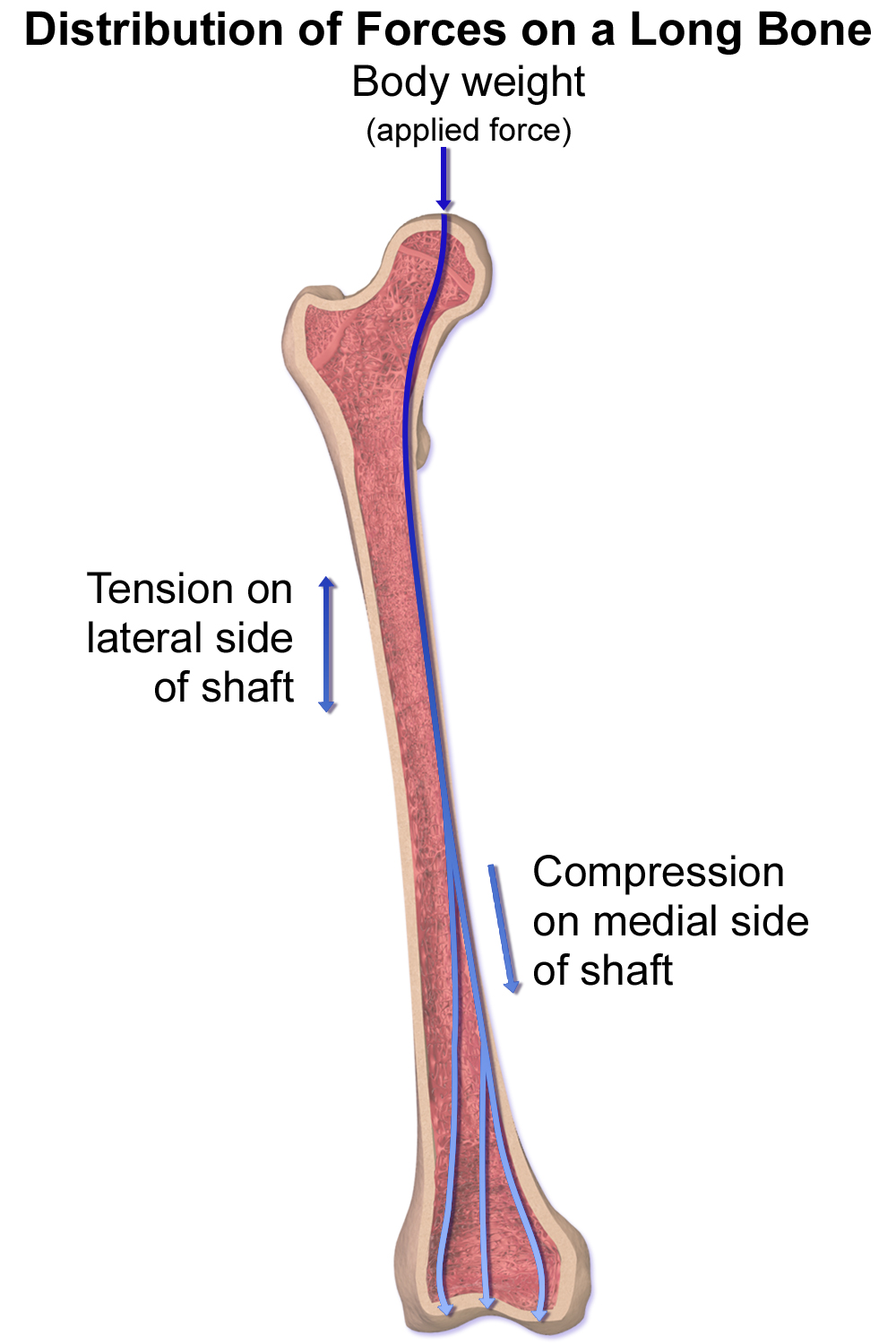
Distribution of forces on a long bone (Femur)

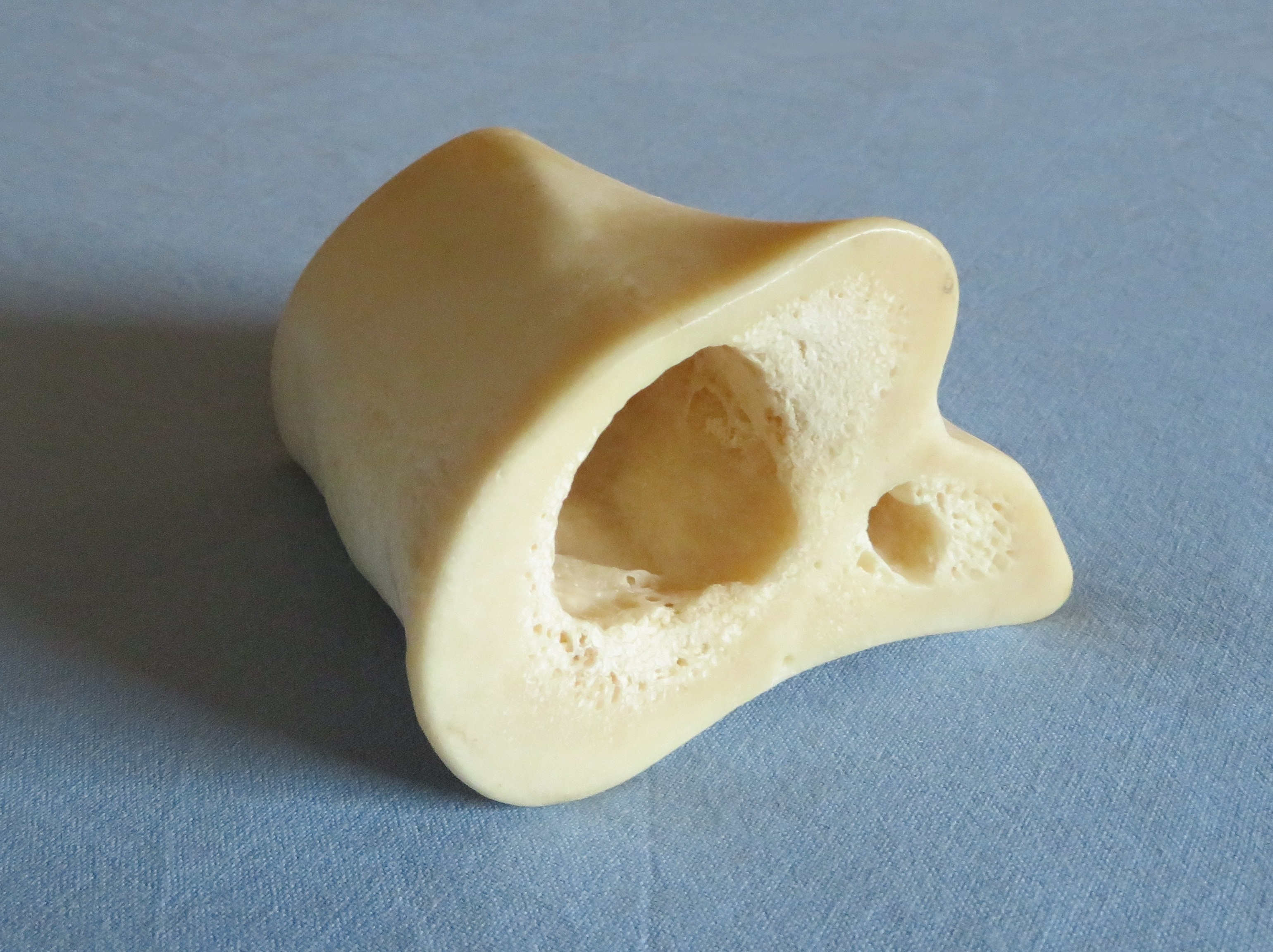
Part of a long bone of a large ungulate

== Clinical significance ==
There are two congenital disorders of the long bones. In a disorder known as rachitis fetalis anularis the ends of the long bones (epiphyses) are enlarged. Another disorder, rachitis fetalis micromelica, is a deficiency in the growth (as a shortness) of the bones.

There is a surgical procedure called distraction osteogenesis which is used to lengthen long bones.
