= Common digital nerves =

Common digital nerves may refer to:

- Common palmar digital nerves of median nerve
- Common palmar digital nerves of ulnar nerve
- Common plantar digital nerves of lateral plantar nerve
- Common plantar digital nerves of medial plantar nerve
