= Plantar digital nerves =

Plantar digital nerves may refer to:

- Common plantar digital nerves of medial plantar nerve
- Common plantar digital nerves of lateral plantar nerve
- Proper plantar digital nerves of lateral plantar nerve
- Proper plantar digital nerves of medial plantar nerve
