= Common palmar digital nerves =

Common palmar digital nerves may refer to:

- Common palmar digital nerves of median nerve
- Common palmar digital nerves of ulnar nerve
