= Common plantar digital nerves =

Common plantar digital nerves can refer to:

- Common plantar digital nerves of medial plantar nerve (nervi digitales plantares communes nervi plantaris medialis)
- Common plantar digital nerves of lateral plantar nerve (nervi digitales plantares communes nervi plantaris lateralis)
