= Palmar digital nerves =

Palmar digital nerves may refer to:

- Common palmar digital nerves of median nerve
- Common palmar digital nerves of ulnar nerve
- Proper palmar digital nerves of median nerve
- Proper palmar digital nerves of ulnar nerve
