= Digital nerve =

Digital nerve may refer to:

- Dorsal digital nerves (disambiguation)
- Palmar digital nerves (disambiguation)
- Plantar digital nerves (disambiguation)
