= Common digital arteries =

Common digital arteries may refer to:

- Common palmar digital arteries
- Common plantar digital arteries
