= Proper digital arteries =

Proper digital arteries may refer to:

- Proper plantar digital arteries
- Proper palmar digital arteries
