= Proper artery =

Proper artery may refer to:

- Hepatic artery proper
- Proper palmar digital arteries
- Proper plantar digital arteries
