= Superficial branch of ulnar nerve =

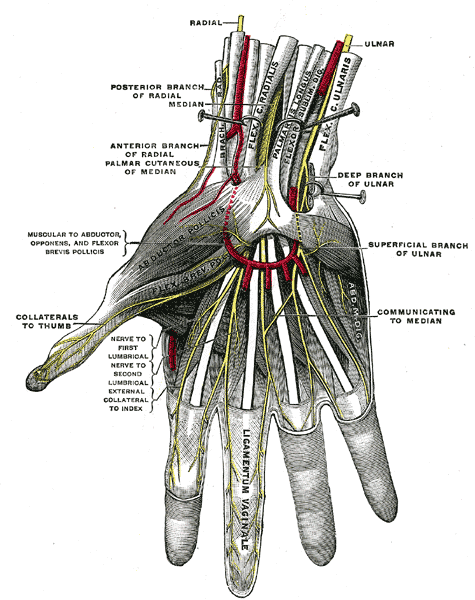
- Superficial palmar nerves. (Superficial branch of ulnar labeled at center right.)

- Diagram of segmental distribution of the cutaneous nerves of the right upper extremity.

Details
- From: Ulnar nerve
- Innervates: Palmaris brevis

Identifiers
- Latin: ramus superficialis nervi ulnaris
- TA98: A14.2.03.045
- TA2: 6454
- FMA: 44876

The superficial branch of the ulnar nerve is a terminal branch of the ulnar nerve. It supplies the palmaris brevis and the skin on the ulnar side of the hand. It also divides into a common palmar digital nerve and a proper palmar digital nerve.

The proper digital branches are distributed to the fingers in the same manner as those of the median nerve.
