= Proper plantar digital nerves of medial plantar nerve =

Nerves of the foot

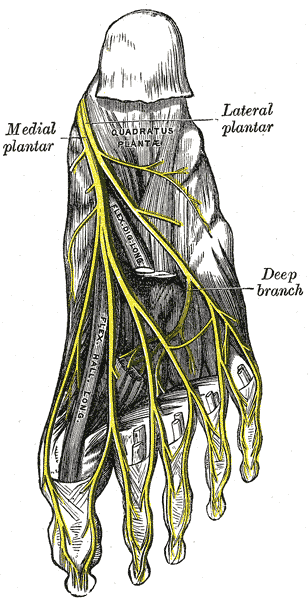
- The plantar nerves.

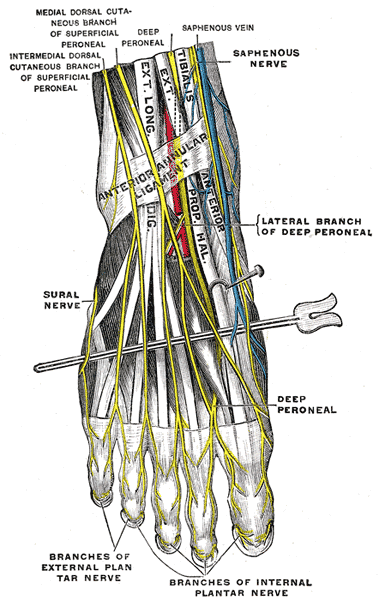
- Nerves of the dorsum of the foot.

Details
- From: medial plantar nerve

Identifiers
- Latin: nervi digitales plantares proprii nervi plantaris medialis
- TA98: A14.2.07.068
- TA2: 6592
- FMA: 75493

The proper plantar digital nerves of medial plantar nerve are nerves of the foot. They primarily arise from the medial plantar nerve's superficial and deep branches. The superficial branch of the medial plantar nerve turns into a proper digital nerve and is responsible for supplies the medial side of the great toe (nn. digitales plantares proprii; plantar digital branches).

Three common digital nerves (nn. digitales plantares communes) arise from the deep branch of the medial plantar nerve and pass between the divisions of the plantar aponeurosis, each splits into two proper digital nerves—those of the first common digital nerve supply the adjacent sides of the great and second toes; those of the second, the adjacent sides of the second and third toes; and those of the third, the adjacent sides of the third and fourth toes.

The third common digital nerve receives a communicating branch from the lateral plantar nerve; that helps innervate the adjacent sides of the third and fourth toes.

Each proper digital nerve gives off cutaneous and articular filaments; and opposite the last phalanx sends upward a dorsal branch, which supplies the structures around the nail, the continuation of the nerve being distributed to the ball of the toe.

It will be observed that these digital nerves are similar in their distribution to those of the median nerve in the hand.

== See also ==
- Proper plantar digital arteries
