= Proper plantar digital nerves of lateral plantar nerve =

Group of nerves of the foot

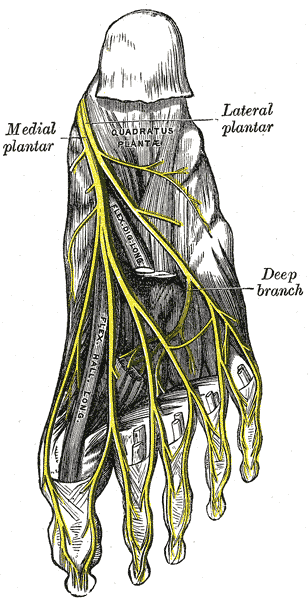
- The plantar nerves.

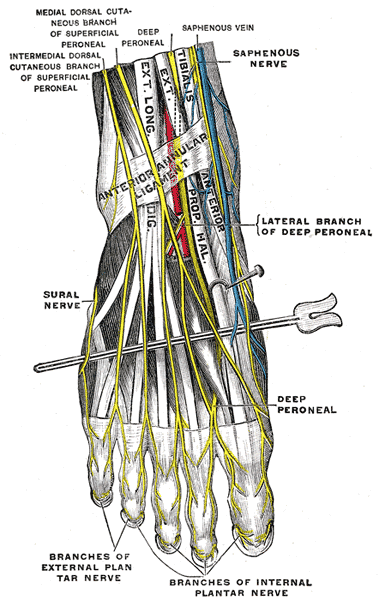
- Nerves of the dorsum of the foot.

Details
- From: lateral plantar nerve

Identifiers
- Latin: nervi digitales plantares proprii nervi plantaris lateralis
- TA98: A14.2.07.072
- TA2: 6596

The proper plantar digital nerves of lateral plantar nerve are nerves of the foot that arise from the superficial branch of the lateral plantar nerve. The superficial branch splits into a proper digital nerve and a common digital nerve:

- the proper digital nerve supplies the lateral side of the little toe,
- the common digital nerve communicates with the third common digital branch of the medial plantar nerve to help supply the adjacent sides of the third and fourth digits, and divides into two proper digital nerves which supply the adjoining sides of the fourth and fifth toes.

== See also ==
- Proper plantar digital arteries
