= Common plantar digital arteries =

Arteries of the foot

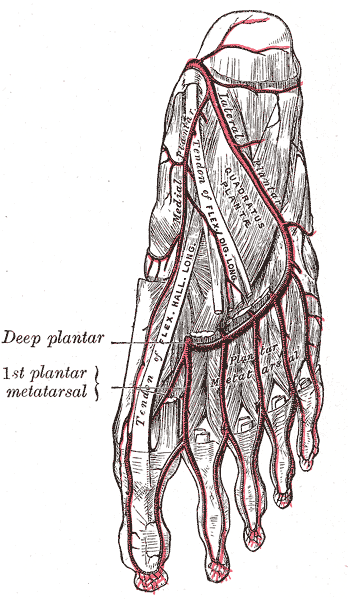
- The plantar arteries. Deep view. (Common plantar digital arteries visible at bottom but not labeled.)

Details
- Source: Plantar metatarsal arteries
- Branches: Proper plantar digital arteries

Identifiers
- Latin: arteriae digitales plantares communes
- TA98: A12.2.16.068
- TA2: 4741
- FMA: 70821

The common plantar digital arteries are arteries of the foot.

== See also ==
- Common plantar digital nerves of medial plantar nerve
- Common plantar digital nerves of lateral plantar nerve
