= Proper palmar digital nerves of ulnar nerve =

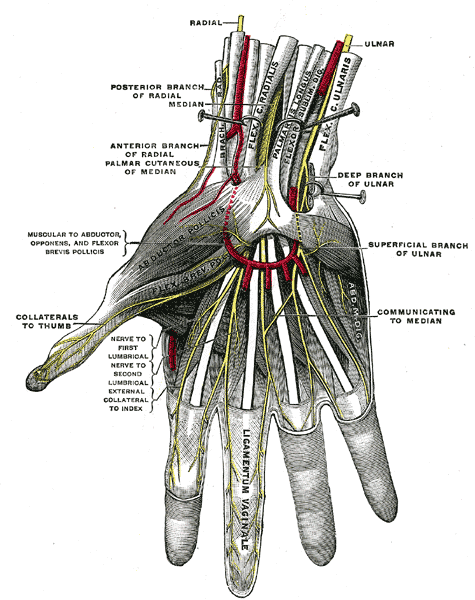
- Superficial palmar nerves.

- Diagram of segmental distribution of the cutaneous nerves of the right upper extremity.

Details
- From: Common palmar digital nerves of ulnar nerve

Identifiers
- Latin: nervi digitales palmares proprii nervi ulnaris
- TA98: A14.2.03.047
- TA2: 6456

The proper palmar digital nerves of the ulnar nerve are nerves of the hand.

The superficial branch of the ulnar nerve divides into a proper palmar digital nerve, which supplies the medial side of the fifth digit and a common palmar digital nerve which divides into two proper palmar digital nerves that supply the adjacent sides of the fourth and fifth digits.

== Additional images ==
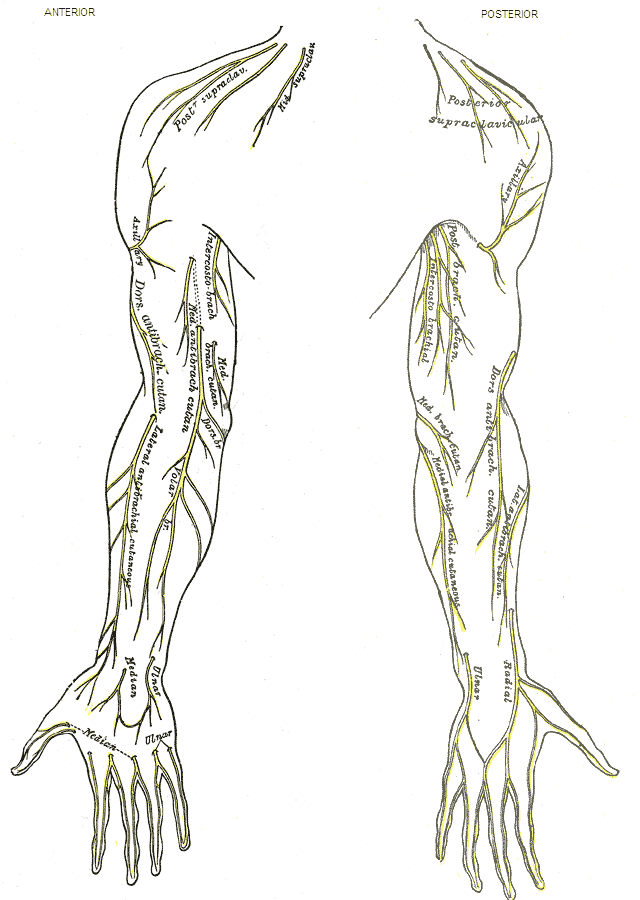
Cutaneous nerves of right upper extremity.
