= Proper plantar digital arteries =

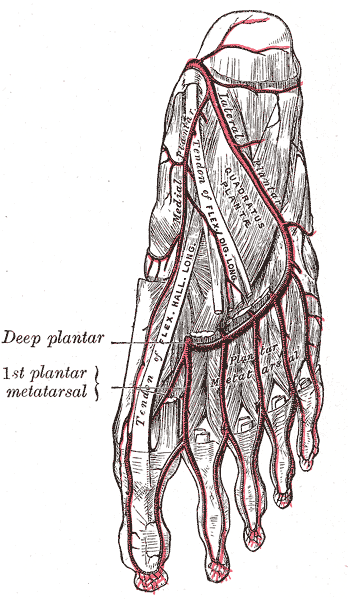
- The plantar arteries. Deep view. (Proper plantar digital arteries visible at bottom but not labeled.)

Details
- Source: Common plantar digital arteries

Identifiers
- Latin: arteriae digitales plantares propriae
- TA98: A12.2.16.069
- TA2: 4742
- FMA: 71564

The proper plantar digital arteries are arteries of the foot.

== See also ==
- Proper plantar digital nerves of medial plantar nerve
- Proper plantar digital nerves of lateral plantar nerve
