= Common plantar digital nerves of lateral plantar nerve =

Nerves of the foot

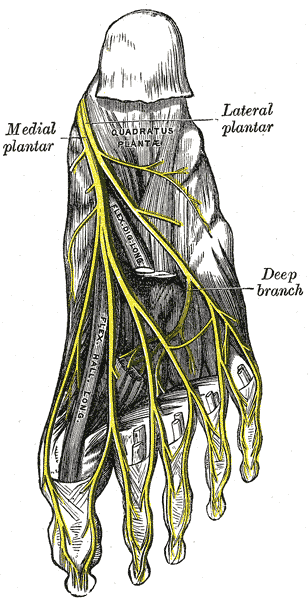
- The plantar nerves.

Details
- From: lateral plantar nerve

Identifiers
- Latin: nervi digitales plantares communes nervi plantaris lateralis
- TA98: A14.2.07.071
- TA2: 6595
- FMA: 75492

The common plantar digital nerves of lateral plantar nerve are nerves of the foot. The common digital nerve communicates with the third common digital branch of the medial plantar nerve and divides into two proper digital nerves which supply the adjoining sides of the fourth and fifth toes.

== See also ==
- Common plantar digital arteries
