= Common palmar digital nerves of ulnar nerve =

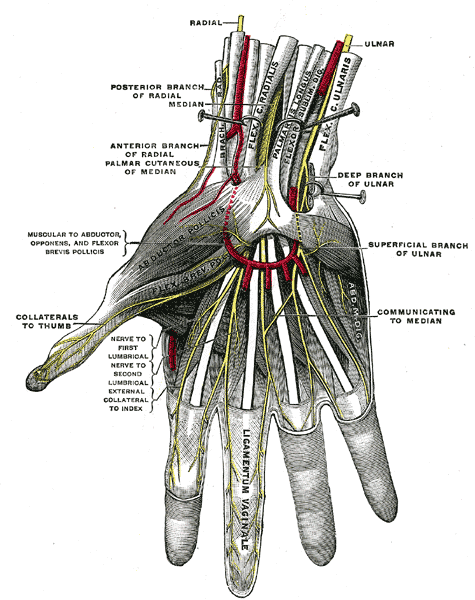
- Superficial palmar nerves.

Details
- From: superficial branch of ulnar nerve
- To: proper palmar digital nerves of ulnar nerve

Identifiers
- Latin: nervi digitales palmares communes nervi ulnaris
- TA98: A14.2.03.046
- TA2: 6455

The common palmar digital nerves of the ulnar nerve are nerves of the hand. The nerve branches off the superficial branch of the ulnar nerve and runs toward the cleft between the ring and little fingers.

== Additional images ==
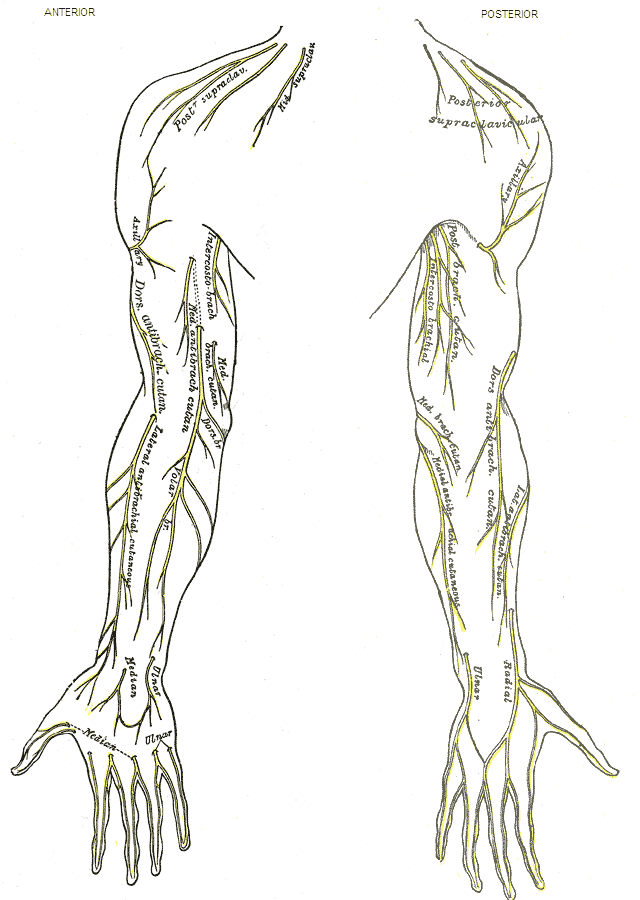
Cutaneous nerves of right upper extremity.

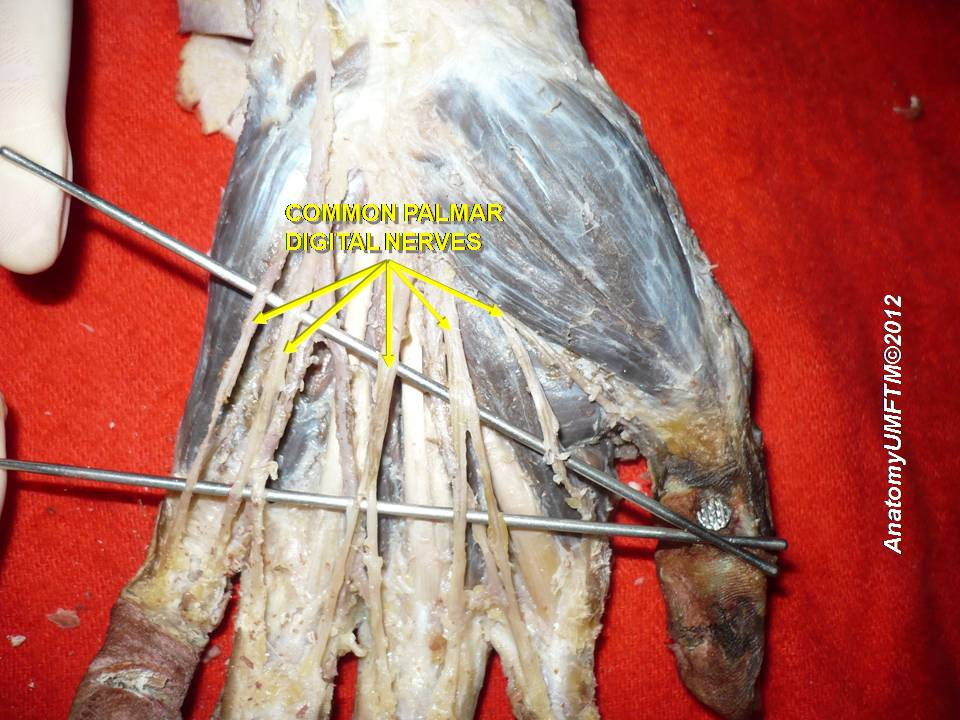
Common palmar digital nerves

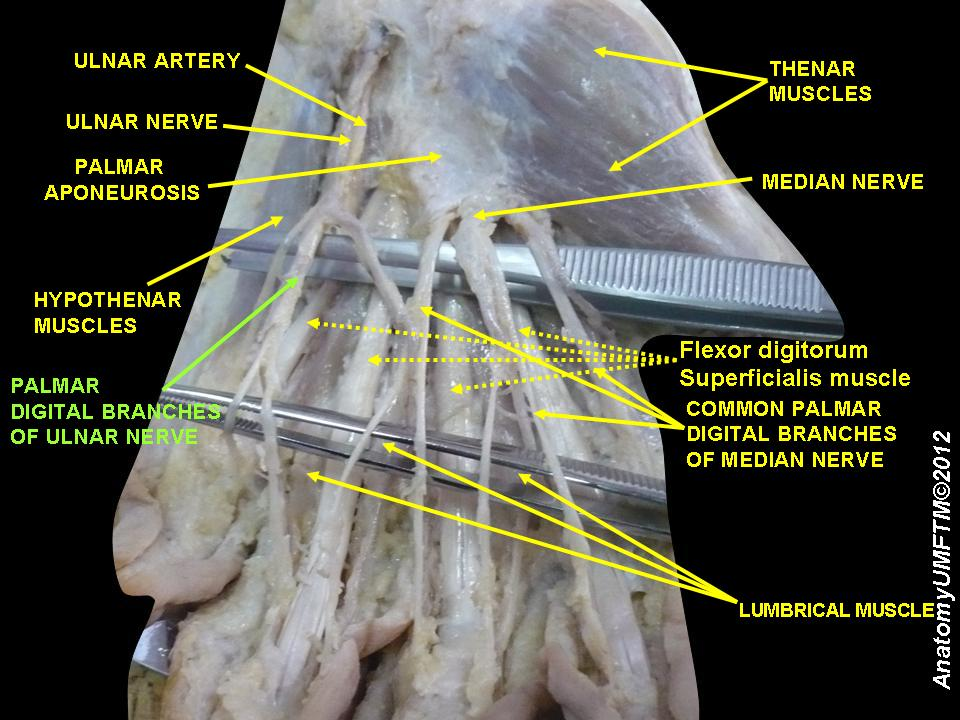
Common palmar digital btanches of ulnar nerves

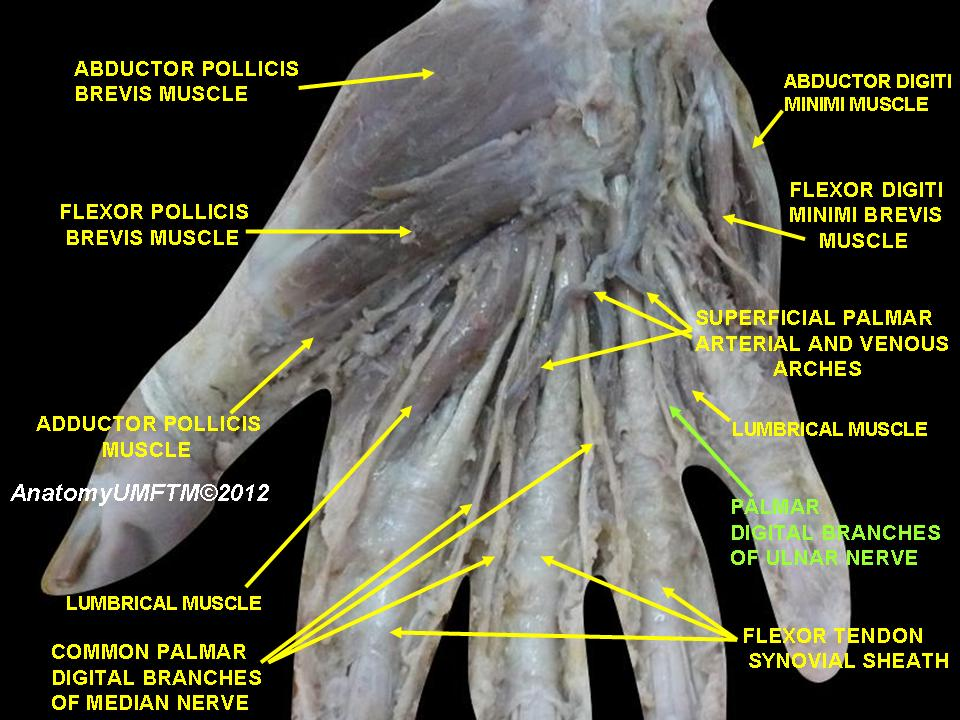
Common palmar digital btanches of ulnar nerves
