= Common plantar digital nerves of medial plantar nerve =

Nerves of the foot

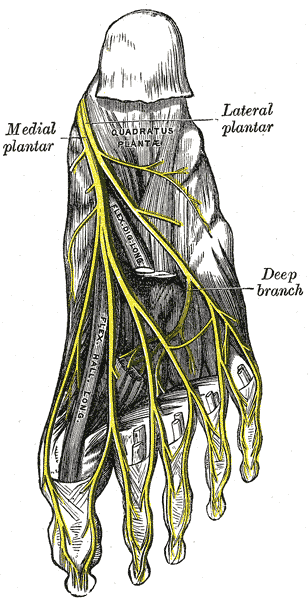
- The plantar nerves.

Details
- From: medial plantar nerve

Identifiers
- Latin: nervi digitales plantares communes nervi plantaris medialis
- TA98: A14.2.07.067
- TA2: 6591

The common plantar digital nerves of medial plantar nerve are nerves of the foot. The three common digital nerves (nn. digitales plantares communes) pass between the divisions of the plantar aponeurosis, and each splits into two proper digital nerves:

- Those of the first common digital nerve supply the adjacent sides of the great and second toes;
- Those of the second, the adjacent sides of the second and third toes; and those of the third, the adjacent sides of the third and fourth toes.
- The third common digital nerve receives a communicating branch from the lateral plantar nerve; the first gives a twig to the first Lumbricalis.

Each proper digital nerve gives off cutaneous and articular filaments; and opposite the last phalanx sends upward a dorsal branch, which supplies the structures around the nail, the continuation of the nerve being distributed to the ball of the toe.

It will be observed that these digital nerves are similar in their distribution to those of the median nerve in the hand.

== See also ==
- Common plantar digital arteries
