= Üner Tan =

Turkish neuroscientist (1937–2022)

Üner Tan (1 May 1937 – 6 February 2022) was a Turkish neuroscientist and evolutionary biologist. He is best known for his discovery and study of the human quadrupedal condition he named the Uner Tan syndrome. He taught at Çukurova University until his retirement in 2004 and had previously taught at several other institutions.

== Biography ==
Tan was born in Ünye, Turkey. He graduated from secondary school in Çorum and started college at Ege University, at the Faculty of Medicine, in 1956. He continued at Göttingen University and graduated from there and the Max-Planck Institute in 1966. He returned to Turkey at 1969 and worked at Hacettepe University in Ankara, and Atatürk University in Erzurum, Black Sea Technical University in Trabzon and Çukurova University in Adana. Tan retired in 2004, and died in February 2022, at the age of 84.

== Uner Tan syndrome ==
According to Tan, persons affected by this syndrome walk with a quadrupedal locomotion and are afflicted with "primitive" speech and severe mental retardation; he postulated that this is an example of backward evolution. He proposed the syndrome after studying the Ulas family of rural southern Turkey, five of whom have these symptoms. The proposed syndrome was featured in the 2006 BBC2 documentary The Family That Walks On All Fours. After his study of the Ulas family, Tan went on to diagnose Uner Tan syndrome in several other families.

Neuroscientist and evolutionary psychologist Roger Keynes, psychologist Nicholas Humphrey and medical scientist John Skoyles have argued that the gait of these individuals is due to two rare phenomena coming together, not atavism. First, instead of initially crawling as infants on their knees, they started off learning to move around with a "bear crawl" on their feet. Second, due to their congenital brain impairment, they found balancing on two legs difficult. Because of this, their motor development was channeled into turning their bear crawl into a substitute for bipedalism.

In the BBC documentary The Family That Walks On All Fours, Nicholas Humphrey refers to Uner Tan's "devolutionary" description of the Ulas family as "scientifically irresponsible."

== See also ==
- The Family That Walks On All Fours, documentary about the Ulas family
- VLDLR-associated cerebellar hypoplasia
