= Uner Tan syndrome =

Medical condition characterized by abnormal gait and severe learning difficulties

Uner Tan syndrome (UTS) is an alleged syndrome that was coined and named eponomously by the Turkish evolutionary biologist Üner Tan. People affected by UTS walk with a quadrupedal locomotion and often have severe learning disabilities. Tan postulated that this is an example of "reverse evolution" (atavism). The proposed syndrome was featured in the 2006 BBC2 documentary The Family That Walks on All Fours.

== History ==
The Ulaş family of nineteen from rural southern Turkey has been the primary example of the proposed syndrome. Tan described five members as walking with a quadrupedal gait using their feet and the palms of their hands. In infants, where this is a rare stage prior and sometimes following bipedal walking, such a gait is called "bear crawl". The affected family members also have learning disabilities and their speech is affected. Tan proposed that these are symptoms of Uner Tan syndrome.

In January 2008, Tan reported on another family (four males and two females) located in southern Turkey.

Four other unrelated cases in families are described as having various degrees of UTS. Two males are unable to stand up, while in other cases, can stand up but cannot make a step when standing. Less severe cases use toe walking, which is a normal phase in child gait development.

== Genetics ==
Uner Tan syndrome has been linked to intrafamilial marriage and reproduction, which suggests that it is an autosomal recessive disorder. The syndrome's main characteristic is habitual quadrupedalism, meaning they can stand up straight until they try to move, then they walk on their hands and knees. According to Tan, the syndrome may be placed in its own category under types of cerebellar ataxias. This simply means it is a type of disorder that involves the cerebellum becoming inflamed, resulting in lack of control of voluntary movements. Uner Tan syndrome falls into this category because it has similar symptoms to other cerebellar ataxia disorders such as disequilibrium syndrome (DES-H) and Cayman Syndrome. These symptoms include dysarthria, nystagmus, and hypoplasia of the cerebellum and vermis.

Human geneticist Tayfun Ozcelik discovered homozygosity in a region on chromosome 9p24 in Uner Tan syndrome individuals. The very low density lipoprotein receptor gene (VLDLR) is located in this region, which is involved in the migration of neuroblasts within the brain. Ozcelik found mutations in the VLDLR gene in affected individuals, and suggested that these specific mutations may lead to VLDLR deficiency during the development of the brain. This may affect the proper formation of cerebrocerebellar structures critical for upright walking, resulting in quadrupedal locomotion. Other genes may also be involved in habitual quadrupedalism. For example, in some affected families, chromosome 17p13 was involved, while in other families 17p13 and 9p24 had no effect. This suggests the syndrome is genetically heterogeneous.

The researchers took a different approach to isolate the gene that causes this syndrome by comparing the genealogy of all the families in which the syndrome had been reported. The two types of Uner Tan Syndrome, UTS type I and type II show genetic heterogeneity. In two of the first families (Antep and Çanakkale families) it was the VLDLR gene on chromosome 9p24. This is the only family so far to express homozygosity. It is possible for dissimilar mutations in the VLDLR gene to result in the same phenotype as a result of allelic heterogeneity. In the Iskenderun family, a different gene, WDR81 on chromosome 17p13.1–13.3 was isolated . The Iraqi family had CA8 on chromosome 8q isolated. In the last family studied (the Adana family), the researchers were not able to isolate any gene, only a locus on chromosome 13q. This isolation led to the implication of more genes as the causes of quadrupedalism. The fact that chromosome 9p24 had no effect on some families points to the genetic heterogeneity of the syndrome.

Another approach for establishing the genealogy has been to compare UTS with similar syndromes such as disequilibrium syndrome (DES) and Joubert syndrome. UTS seems to be genetically different from DES in that DES can be linked to a single gene, VLDLR, located on chromosome 9p24. When compared with DES, Joubert syndrome has shown links to seven gene mutations. As is the case with almost all diseases, the three syndromes compared show allelic heterogeneity.

Researchers recently isolated a recessive TUBB2B mutation in one of the families diagnosed with UTS. This makes TUBB2B the fifth gene after VLDLR, WDR81, CA8 and ATP8A2, associated with this syndrome. Patients with mutations of TUBB2B are phenotypically similar to those with VLDLR, WDR81 and ATP8A2 mutations. The researchers proposed a tentative reclassification of UTS into three types based on how they present themselves clinically. They attribute the first type (referred to as developmental UTS) to mutations in TUBB2B and VLDLR. Type II (degenerative UTS) is linked to ATP8A2 and WDR81 while type III (UTS without cerebral malformations) implicates CA8.

The problem with identifying the specific mutation that leads to Uner Tan syndrome is the fact that different mutations in a single gene can lead to a wide range of phenotypes. In the VLDLR gene, similar mutations may be responsible for different types of cerebellar ataxias that affect proper locomotion in humans.

== Criticism ==
Neuroscientist and evolutionary psychologist Roger Keynes, psychologist Nicholas Humphrey and medical scientist John Skoyles have argued that the gait of these individuals is due to two rare phenomena coming together, not atavism. First, instead of initially crawling as infants on their knees, they started off learning to move around with a "bear crawl" on their feet. Second, due to their congenital brain impairment, they found balancing on two legs difficult. Because of this, their motor development was channeled into turning their bear crawl into a substitute for bipedalism.

Üner Tan and colleagues claim that UTS differs from disequilibrium syndrome.

It's terribly easy to be led away by some notion of living fossils... I'm not going to make any bones about this. I think that Professor Tan's description of this family as a "devolution", as an evolutionary throwback, is not only scientifically irresponsible, but is deeply insulting to this family.

— Nicholas Humphrey, The Family That Walks on All Fours

== See also ==
- The Family That Walks On All Fours, documentary about the Ulas family
- VLDLR-associated cerebellar hypoplasia
