= Human skeletal changes due to bipedalism =

Evolutionary changes to the human skeleton as a consequence of bipedalism

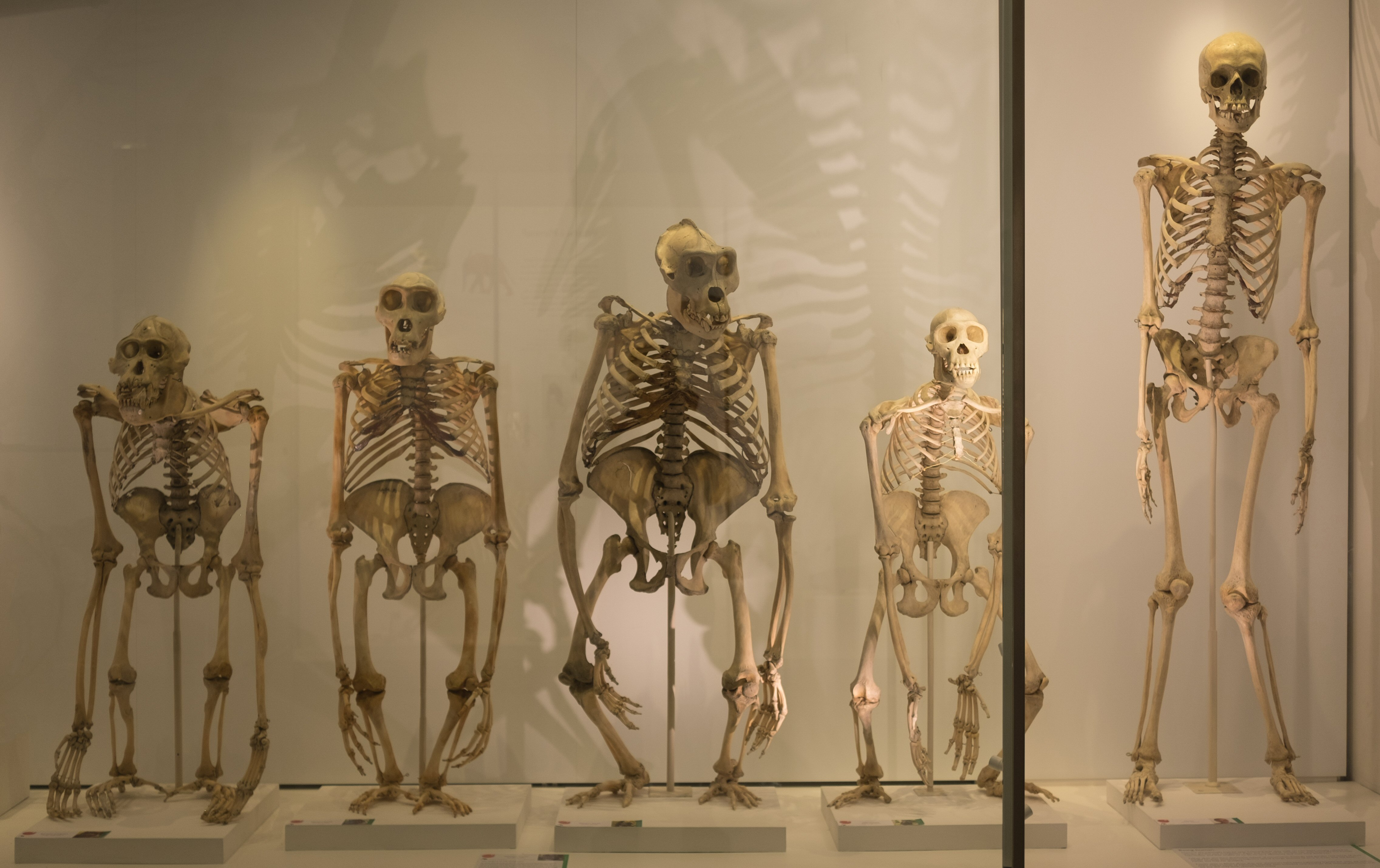
Ape skeletons. A display at the Museum of Zoology, University of Cambridge. From left to right: Bornean orangutan, two western gorillas, chimpanzee, human.

The evolution of human bipedalism, which began in primates approximately four million years ago, or as early as seven million years ago with Sahelanthropus, or approximately twelve million years ago with Danuvius guggenmosi, has led to morphological alterations to the human skeleton including changes to the arrangement, shape, and size of the bones of the foot, hip, knee, leg, and the vertebral column. These changes allowed for the upright gait to be overall more energy efficient in comparison to quadrupeds. The evolutionary factors that produced these changes have been the subject of several theories that correspond with environmental changes on a global scale.

== Energy efficiency ==
Human walking is about 75% less costly than both quadrupedal and bipedal walking in chimpanzees. Some hypotheses have supported that bipedalism increased the energetic efficiency of travel and that this was an important factor in the origin of bipedal locomotion. Humans save more energy than quadrupeds when walking but not when running. Human running is 75% less efficient than walking. A 1980 study reported that walking in living hominin bipeds is noticeably more efficient than walking in living hominin quadrupeds, but the costs of quadrupedal and bipedal travel are the same.

== Foot ==
Human feet evolved enlarged heels. The human foot evolved as a platform to support the entire weight of the body, rather than acting as a grasping structure (like hands), as it did in early hominids. Humans therefore have smaller toes than their bipedal ancestors. This includes a non-opposable hallux, which is relocated in line with the other toes. The push off would also require all the toes to be slightly bent up.

Humans have a foot arch rather than being flat footed. When non-human hominids walk upright, weight is transmitted from the heel, along the outside of the foot, and then through the middle toes while a human foot transmits weight from the heel, along the outside of the foot, across the ball of the foot and finally through the big toe. This transference of weight contributes to energy conservation during locomotion. The muscles that work along with the hallux have evolved to provide efficient push off. The long arch has also evolved to provide efficient push-off. The stiffening of the arch would be required of an upward gait, all considered that modern bipedalism does not include grasping of tree branches, which also explains the hallux evolving to line up with the rest of the toes.

== Knee ==
Human knee joints are enlarged for the same reason as the hip – to better support an increased amount of body weight. The degree of knee extension (the angle between the thigh and shank in a walking cycle) has decreased. The changing pattern of the knee joint angle of humans shows a small extension peak, called the "double knee action," in the midstance phase. Double knee action decreases energy lost by vertical movement of the center of gravity. Humans walk with their knees kept straight and the thighs bent inward so that the knees are almost directly under the body, rather than out to the side, as is the case in ancestral hominids. This type of gait also aids balance.

== Limbs ==
An increase in leg length since the evolution of bipedalism changed how leg muscles functioned in upright gait. In humans, the push for walking comes from the leg muscles acting at the ankle. A longer leg allows the use of the natural swing of the limb so that, when walking, humans do not need to use muscle to swing the other leg forward for the next step. As a consequence, since the human forelimbs are not needed for locomotion, they are instead optimized for carrying, holding, and manipulating objects with great precision. This results in decreased strength in the forelimbs relative to body size for humans compared to apes.

Having long hind limbs and short forelimbs allows humans to walk upright, while orangutans and gibbons had the adaptation of longer arms to swing on branches. Apes can stand on their hindlimbs, but they cannot do so for long periods of time without getting tired. This is because their femurs are not adapted for bipedalism. Apes have vertical femurs, while humans have femurs that are slightly angled medially from the hip to the knee, thus making human knees closer together and under the body's center of gravity. This adaptation lets humans lock their knees and stand up straight for long periods of time without much effort from muscles. The gluteus maximus became a major role in walking and is one of the largest muscles in humans. This muscle is much smaller in chimps, which shows that it has an important role in bipedalism. When humans run, our upright posture tends to flex forward as each foot strikes the ground creating momentum forward. The gluteus muscle helps to prevent the upper trunk of the body from "pitching forward" or falling over.

== Hip and pelvis ==
Modern human hip joints are larger than in quadrupedal ancestral species to better support the greater amount of body weight passing through them. They also have a shorter, broader shape. This alteration in shape brought the vertebral column closer to the hip joint, providing a stable base for support of the trunk while walking upright. Because bipedal walking requires humans to balance on a relatively unstable ball and socket joint, the placement of the vertebral column closer to the hip joint allows humans to invest less muscular effort in balancing.

Change in the shape of the hip may have led to the decrease in the degree of hip extension, an energy efficient adaptation. The ilium changed from a long and narrow shape to a short and broad one and the walls of the pelvis modernized to face laterally. These combined changes provide increased area for the gluteus muscles to attach; this helps to stabilize the torso while standing on one leg. The sacrum has also become more broad, increasing the diameter of the birth canal and making birthing easier. To increase surface for ligament attachment to help support the abdominal viscera during erect posture, the ischial spines became more prominent and shifted towards the middle of the body.

== Vertebral column ==
The vertebral column of humans takes a forward bend (physiological kyphosis) in the thoracic (upper) region and a backward bend (lordosis) in the lumbar (lower) region. Without the lumbar curve, the vertebral column would always lean forward, a posture that requires much more muscular effort to remain erect for bipedal animals. With such spinal curvatures, humans use less muscular effort to stand and walk upright, as together the thoracic and lumbar curves bring the body's center of gravity directly over the feet. Specifically, the S-shaped curve in the spine brings the center of gravity closer to the hips by bringing the torso back. Balance of the whole vertebral column over the hip joints is a major contribution for efficient bipedalism. The degree of body erection (the angle of body incline to a vertical line in a walking cycle) is significantly smaller to conserve energy.

The Angle of Sacral Incidence was a concept developed by G. Duval-Beaupère and his team at the University of René Descartes. It combines both the pelvic tilt and sacral slope to determine approximately how much lordosis is required for the upright gait to eliminate strain and fatigue on the torso. Lordosis, which the inward curvature of the spine, is normal for an upright gait as long as it is not too excessive or minimal. If the inward curvature of the spine is not enough, the center of balance would be offset causing the body to essentially tip forward, which is why some apes that have the ability to be bipedal require large amounts of energy to stand up. In addition to sacral angles, the sacrum has also evolved to be more flexible in comparison to the stiff sacrum that apes possess.

== Skull ==
The human skull is balanced on the vertebral column. The foramen magnum is located inferiorly under the skull, which puts much of the weight of the head behind the spine. The flat human face helps to maintain balance on the occipital condyles. Because of this, the erect position of the head is possible without the prominent supraorbital ridges and the strong muscular attachments found in, for example, apes. As a result, in humans the muscles of the forehead (the occipitofrontalis) are only used for facial expressions.

Increasing brain size has also been significant in human evolution. It began to increase approximately 2.4 million years ago, but modern levels of brain size were not attained until after 500,000 years ago. Zoological analyses have shown that the size of human brains is significantly larger than what anatomists would expect for their size. The human brain is three to four times larger than its closest living relative, which is the chimpanzee.

== Significance ==
Even with much modification, some features of the human skeleton remain poorly adapted to bipedalism, leading to negative implications prevalent in humans today. The lower back and knee joints are plagued by osteological malfunction, lower back pain being a leading cause of lost working days, because the joints support more weight. Arthritis has been an obstacle since hominids became bipedal: scientists have discovered its traces in the vertebrae of prehistoric hunter-gatherers. Physical constraints have made it difficult to modify the joints for further stability while maintaining efficiency of locomotion.

There have been multiple theories as to why bipedalism was favored, thus leading to skeletal changes that aided the upward gait. The savannah hypothesis describes how the transition from arboreal habits to a savannah lifestyle favored an upright, bipedal gait. This would also change the diet of hominins, more specifically a shift from primarily plant-based to a higher protein, meat-based diet. This would eventually increase the size of the brain, changing the skeletal structure of the skull. Transitions from the forests to the savannah meant that sunlight and heat would require major changes in lifestyle. Being a biped on an open field is also an advantage because of heat dispersal. Walking upright reduces the amount of direct sun exposure and radiation in comparison to being a quadruped which have more body surface on top for the sun to hit. Increased capabilities of postural/locomotor neural control is hypothesis suggesting that the transition from quadrupedal to habitual upright bipedal locomotion was caused by qualitative changes in the nervous system that allowed controlling the more demanding type of posture/locomotion. Only after the more demanding posture was enabled by changes in the nervous system, could advantages of bipedal over quadrupedal locomotion be utilized, including better scanning of the environment, carrying food and infants, simultaneous upper extremity movements and observation of the environment, limitless manipulation of objects with upper extremities, and less space for rotating around the Z-axis.

== See also ==
- Happisburgh footprints
- Ileret footprints
- Laetoli footprints
- Obstetrical dilemma
