= The Dragons of Eden =

1977 book by Carl Sagan

The Dragons of Eden: Speculations on the Evolution of Human Intelligence
- Cover of the first edition
- Author: Carl Sagan
- Cover artist: Don Davis
- Language: English
- Subjects: Human evolution Intelligence
- Publisher: Random House
- Publication date: 1977
- Publication place: United States
- Media type: Print (Hardcover and Paperback)
- Pages: 263 (first edition)
- ISBN: 0-394-41045-9
- OCLC: 2922889
- Dewey Decimal: 153
- LC Class: BF431 .S2
- Followed by: Broca's Brain

The Dragons of Eden: Speculations on the Evolution of Human Intelligence is a 1977 book by Carl Sagan, in which the author combines the fields of anthropology, evolutionary biology, psychology, and computer science to give a perspective on how human intelligence may have evolved.

Sagan discusses the search for a quantitative means of measuring intelligence. He argues that the brain to body mass ratio is an extremely good correlative indicator for intelligence, with humans having the highest ratio and dolphins the second highest, though he views the trend as breaking down at smaller scales, with some small animals (ants in particular) placing disproportionately high on the list. Other topics mentioned include the evolution of the brain (with emphasis on the function of the neocortex in humans), the evolutionary purpose of sleep and dreams, demonstration of sign language abilities by chimps and the purpose of mankind's innate fears and myths. The title "The Dragons of Eden" is borrowed from the notion that man's early struggle for survival in the face of predators, and in particular a fear of reptiles, may have led to cultural beliefs and myths about dragons.

The Dragons of Eden won a Pulitzer Prize. In 2002, John Skoyles and Dorion Sagan published a follow-up entitled Up from Dragons.

== Summary ==
The book is an expansion of the Jacob Bronowski Memorial Lecture in Natural Philosophy which Sagan gave at the University of Toronto. In the introduction Sagan presents his thesis – that "the mind ... [is] a consequence of its anatomy and physiology and nothing more" – in reference to the works of Charles Darwin and Alfred Russel Wallace.

In chapter 2, Sagan briefly summarizes the entire evolution of species starting from the Big Bang to the beginning of the human civilization with the help of a "Cosmic Calendar", an analogy where one year in the calendar corresponds to the time since the Big Bang. Sagan used the same analogy in the more-widely known television series Cosmos.

It is disconcerting to find that in such a cosmic year the Earth does not condense out of interstellar matter until early September, dinosaurs emerge on Christmas Eve; flowers arise on December 28; and men and women originate at 10:30 P.M. on New Year's Eve. All of recorded history occupies the last 10 seconds of December 31; and the time from the waning of the Middle Ages to the present occupies little more than one second.

== Reception ==
Writing for the New York Times, John Leonard called the book "a delight" and described Sagan as "a scientific Robert Redford, handsome and articulate and all business." The book was awarded a Pulitzer Prize in 1978.

== In popular culture ==
In 2008, an album called The Dragons of Eden was released by keyboard player and producer Travis Dickerson along with guitar virtuoso Buckethead and drummer Bryan "Brain" Mantia. The album derives its track titles from the book's chapters.

== See also ==
- Brain-to-body mass ratio
- Triune brain
