= Ulas family =

Turkish family

The Ulas family of 19 is from rural southern Turkey. Five of the family members (except for another, who has died) walk on all fours with their feet and the palms of their hands in what is called a "bear crawl". Their quadrupedal gait had never been reported in anatomically intact adult humans, but was later also discovered in other families in the region. The gait is different from the knuckle-walking quadrupedal gait of apes. In 2006, the family was the subject of a documentary: The Family That Walks on All Fours.

The affected people have a form of non-progressive congenital cerebellar ataxia. The brain impairments include cerebellar hypoplasia, mild cerebral cortex atrophy and a reduced corpus callosum. They are also mildly intellectually disabled and have problems in balancing on two legs. However, they do not show the poor coordination of hands, speech, and eye movements often found in cerebellar ataxia. The four sisters can do needlework. They all share a recessive mutation on chromosome 17p.

== Sources ==
Üner Tan of Çukurova University Medical School in Adana, said that they show characteristics of the primate ancestors of Homo sapiens, before the move to bipedalism. He called the process "backward evolution" and he named the condition Uner Tan syndrome.

However, Nicholas Humphrey, John Skoyles, and Roger Keynes have argued that their gait is due to two rare phenomena coming together. First, instead of initially crawling as infants on their knees, they started off learning to move around with a "bear crawl" on their feet. Second, due to their congenital brain impairment, they found balancing on two legs difficult. Because of this, their motor development was channeled into turning their bear crawl into a substitute for bipedality.

Defne Aruoba is a Turkish psychologist who was involved with the care and research of the Ulas family. Because of her experience working with the Ulas family, she planned to establish the Ulas Foundation, which will bridge the gap between social inequalities and contact other individuals and families in need of rehabilitation.

== See also ==
- Bipedalism – Terrestrial locomotion using two limbs
- Knuckle-walking – Form of quadrupedal walking using the knuckles
- Quadrupedalism – Form of locomotion using four limbs
- Uner Tan syndrome – Medical condition characterized by abnormal gait and severe learning difficulties
