= Solitary birth =

Giving birth by yourself

Solitary birth is the relatively unusual circumstance of human women delivering babies alone. Solitary birth is typically unplanned and thus is distinct from the unassisted birth movement.

Carla Emery provided guidelines for solitary delivery of "wilderness babies" in her Encyclopedia of Country Living. Key directives from the section "Giving Birth by Yourself" included don't yank on the umbilical cord and do clear mucus from the baby's nose and mouth. Many inadvertent born before arrival (BBA) outside-of-hospital deliveries in automobiles are de facto solitary births. These deliveries tend to be second or third or higher-order births.

Solitary birth is a cultural practice of the !Kung people; solitary birth amongst the !Kung demonstrates female bravery. In practice, primigravidas are usually assisted by female relatives but multigravidas typically manage the entire birth process alone (and silently) in the bush. Bariba women in Benin have also traditionally practiced solitary birth. The Rarámuri people of northern Mexico have been the focus of public health efforts to decrease maternal mortality by encouraging the use of birth attendants.

The common use of midwives or birth assistants in human culture is thought to date to the "pelvic reorientation associated with bipedalism" and was reinforced by the "encephalization seen in the genus Homo." Humans may have evolved obligate midwifery as a cultural adjunct to childbirth due to the occiput anterior position of newborns emerging from the vagina, because human newborns are particularly altricial, and for social-emotional reasons. However a 2018 observational study found that bonobos exhibit "midwifery" behaviors as well and postulated that the practice was related to a primate-level "capacity of unrelated females to form strong social bonds and cooperate."

== See also ==
- Obstetric paradox
