= Faith (dog) =

Bipedal dog

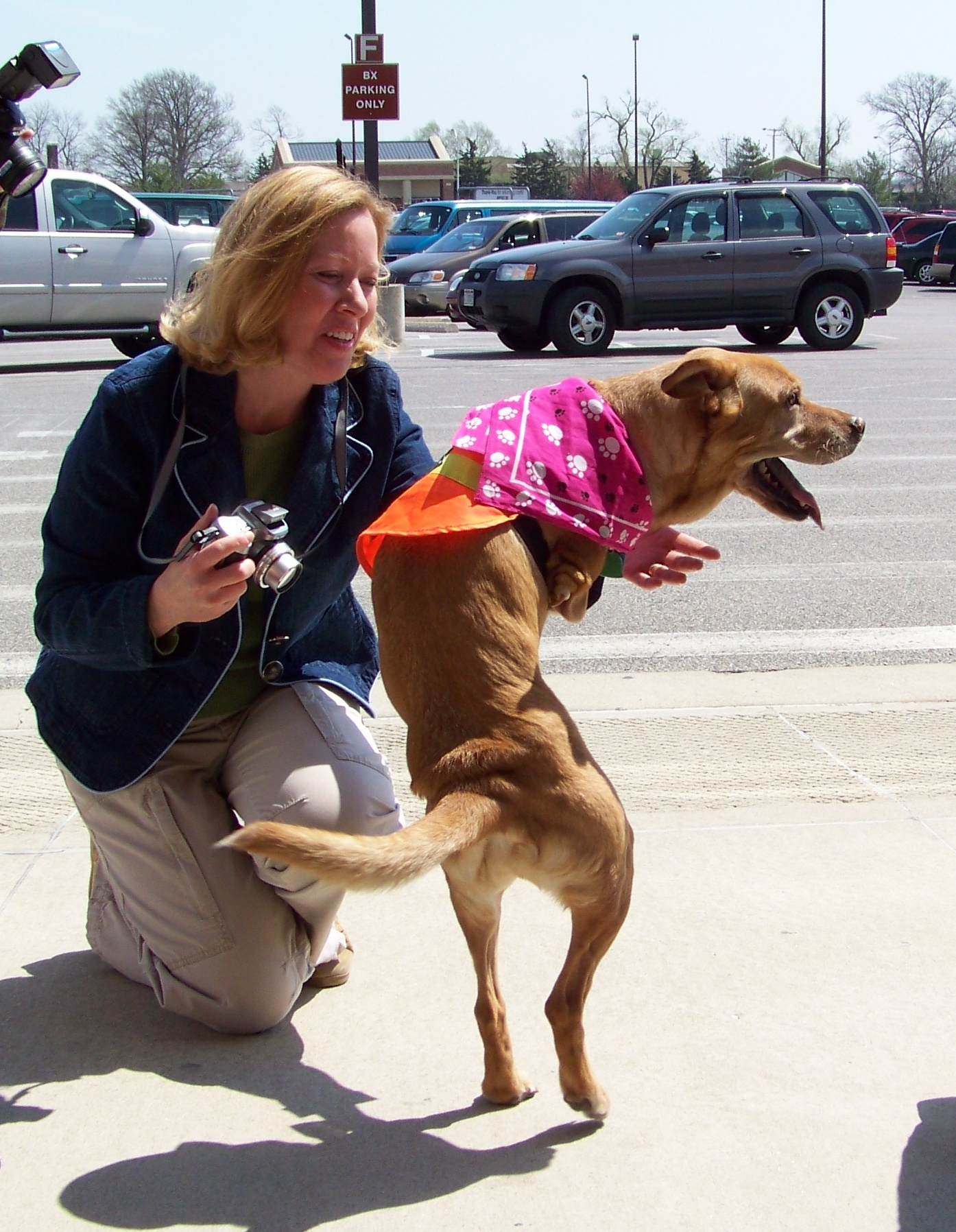
- Faith in 2008
- Sex: Female
- Born: December 22, 2002; Oklahoma City, Oklahoma
- Died: September 22, 2014 (aged 11); Hendricks County, Indiana
- Notable role: Family pet
- Years active: 2002–2014
- Known for: bipedal dog

Faith (December 22, 2002 – September 22, 2014) was a bipedal dog.

== Life ==
Faith was born with three legs; two fully developed hind legs and a deformed front leg, which was amputated when she was seven months old after it began to atrophy. Her owner, Jude Stringfellow, adopted Faith when the mother dog was found trying to smother the deformed puppy—her son rescued the puppy and brought her home. Many people, including veterinarians, advised that Faith be euthanized. Instead, Jude taught Faith to hop using a spoon with peanut butter. Faith began to walk on her own, and the family's corgi would bark at Faith from another room, or nip her heels to urge her to walk.

Faith was given a non-commission rank of E5 Sgt. at Ft. Lewis, Washington in June 2006. She visited more than 2,300 wounded warriors in hospitals and wards throughout the world, and was seen by more than 2,000,000 active soldiers at bases, airports, and ceremonies. She wore an ACU jacket and would get excited when it was pulled out of the closet, as she knew it meant she was about to meet soldiers.

A book about Faith was published, titled Faith Walks...A Memoir of a Beautiful Life. Faith and Stringfellow were featured on Maury, The Oprah Winfrey Show, The Montel Williams Show, Animal Attractions Television and Ripley's Believe it or Not. Faith also had a brief mention on the PBS show NOVA in the episode The Family That Walks On All Fours. A short article on Faith that appeared in the "racy" London lad mag Bizarre in 2004 was allegedly the cause of Stringfellow's dismissal from her culinary college teaching job. The dog was also rumored to have been considered for an appearance in Harry Potter and the Goblet of Fire.

In February 2007, MSNBC reported that American Airlines had accidentally sent Faith to a different destination than her owner, after changing planes in Dallas during a flight back from Oklahoma City to Orlando.

Her death was announced on September 22, 2014.

== See also ==
- List of individual dogs
