= The Family That Walks on All Fours =

- Genre: Documentary
- Country of origin: United Kingdom

Production
- Producer: Jemima Harrison
- Running time: 59:10
- Production company: Passionate Productions

Original release
- Network: BBC Two
- Release: 17 March 2006

The Family That Walks on All Fours is a BBC Two documentary that explored the science and the story of five individuals in the Ulas family, a Turkish family in Southeastern Turkey that walk with a previously unreported quadruped gait.

The documentary about a family in Turkey was created by Passionate Productions and was broadcast on 17 March 2006. The narrator is Jemima Harrison. A revised version of the documentary that shifts the focus away from the story of the discovery of the family and includes the views of additional scientists was shown on NOVA on 14 November 2006.

== Background ==
Debate exists as to the nature and cause of the family's walking, including controversial speculation in the form of the Uner Tan syndrome that it may be a genetic throwback to pre-bipedal hominid locomotion. However, Nicholas Humphrey, who accompanied the documentary makers, concluded that it was due to a rare set of genetic and developmental circumstances coming together. First, their mother recalls that initially all of her 19 children started off walking with a bear-crawl (i.e. on their feet rather than their knees). Second, due to an inherited recessive genetic mutation, they have a non-progressive congenital cerebellar ataxia that impairs the balance children normally use to learn to walk bipedally. Not being able to manage the balance needed for bipedal walking, they perfected in its place their initial bear-crawl into an adult quadruped gait. The family's walking likely has nothing to do with genes involved in the human evolution of upright walk.

== Synopsis ==
In June 2005, Nicholas Humphrey receives a call from John Skoyles who has seen an unpublished paper by Uner Tan that focuses upon hand dominance in the family.

In the film, two British scientists and Tan visit the family and their father, Resit. There are 19 children in the family, 12 of them typical, and seven were handicapped, one of whom died. The commentary first introduces Gülin and notes that he "staggers as if he's drunk" but walks on two feet. Then each of the affected hand-walking individuals is introduced: the four sisters Safiye, Hacer, Senem and Emine, and their brother, Hüseyin. Contrasting with these scenes of sadness, we then see the family enjoying themselves at a sandy beach only an hour's drive away. In spite of its nearness, they have never been to the sea before. They are shown paddling and touching the sea waves. Hatice, their mother, upon seeing the sea for the first time in her life, says that she did not know that Allah had made such beauty.

The narrator explains that it has been explained to the family that the film will put the world's spotlight on them. Resit says he does not want them compared to monkeys. He does not believe in evolution but also he philosophically observes words cannot harm them and film might bring help and a little understanding. Nicholas Humphrey expresses his concern that this phenomenon may never be seen again.

In January 2006, the film makers return to the family. Before they left, parallel bars had been bought on Dr. Ali's advice and put outside so the family could exercise upright walking and they have done this nearly every day. The family is seen smiling as they have made progress in learning to walk - and the film closes with Hüseyin walking up a path on two legs.

== Production crew ==
- Writer, director, narrator and editor: Jemima Harrison
- Photographer and producer: Jon Lane
- Computer model: Premog
- Titles: Alex Pritchard
- Additional photography: Darren Hercher
- Production Assistant: Chloe Hayward
- Additional Research: David Boardman
- Archive researcher: Elizabeth Ashe
- Colourist: Malcom Merdith
- Dubbing mixer: Matt Skilton
- Online Editor: Jim Dummett
- Executive Producer for BBC: Richard Klein
- Consultants, Turkey: Defne Aruoba, Cetin Mursalioğlu
- Consultants, UK: Nick Humphrey, Roger Keynes, John Skoyles

== See also ==
- Knuckle-walking
