= Simon G. Powell =

British writer, film-maker and musician

Simon G. Powell is a British writer, film-maker and musician. His work has been primarily concerned with the use of psilocybin in human history and the present day and with the relationship between humanity and nature as well as the philosophical questions regarding the underlying intelligence behind the universe. He is particularly concerned with the concept of biophilia.

== Career ==
Powell graduated from University College London in 1992. From the 1990s onwards he then used psilocybin on over one hundred occasions, as well as similar drugs such as ayahuasca and has documented his experiences (such as a discussion of his journey to the Royal Botanical Gardens at Kew) and used them as springboards for wider discussions of the meaning of hallucinogenic experiences and how they connect us to what he perceives of as forms of universal and natural intelligence.

As well as writing and making films and music, Powell also regularly gives talks regarding topics such as psilocybin and natural intelligence.

He lives in London.

== Works ==
=== Books ===
- The Psilocybin Solution: The Role of Sacred Mushrooms in the Quest for Meaning - with a foreword by Graham Hancock (2011)
- Darwin's Unfinished Business: The Self-Organizing Intelligence of Nature - written with Dorion Sagan (2012)
- Magic Mushroom Explorer: Psilocybin and the Awakening Earth (2015)

=== Films ===
- Manna: Towards a New Understanding of Nature (2003)
- Metanoia: A New Vision of Nature (2007)
- Moksha Medicine (2016)
