= Knuckle-walking =

Form of quadrupedal walking using the knuckles

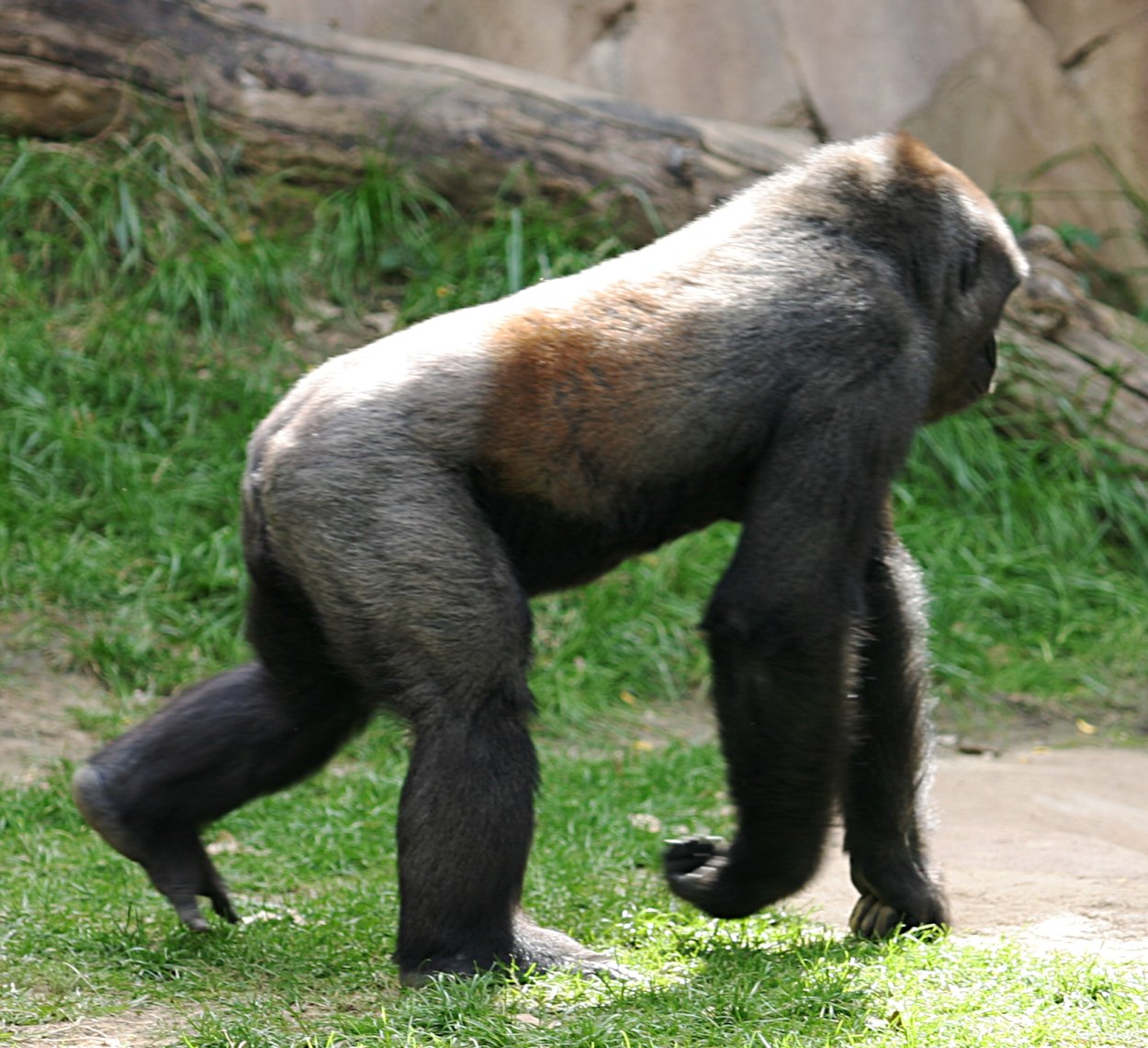
A western lowland gorilla knuckle-walking.

Knuckle-walking is a form of quadrupedal walking in which the forelimbs hold the fingers in a partially flexed posture that allows body weight to press down on the ground through the knuckles. Gorillas and chimpanzees use this style of locomotion, as do anteaters and platypuses.

Knuckle-walking helps with actions other than locomotion on the ground. Gorillas use fingers for the manipulation of food, whereas chimpanzees use fingers for the manipulation of food and climbing. In anteaters and pangolins, the fingers have large claws for opening the mounds of social insects. Platypus fingers have webbing that extends past the fingers which aids in swimming, thus knuckle-walking is used to prevent stumbling. Gorillas move around by knuckle-walking, although they sometimes walk bipedally for short distances while carrying food or in defensive situations. Mountain gorillas use knuckle-walking plus other parts of their hand—fist-walking does not use the knuckles, using the backs of their hand, and using their palms.

Anthropologists once thought that the common ancestor of chimpanzees and humans engaged in knuckle-walking, and humans evolved upright walking from knuckle-walking, a view thought to be supported by reanalysis of overlooked features on hominid fossils. Since then, scientists discovered Ardipithecus ramidus, a human-like hominid descended from the common ancestor of chimpanzees and humans. Ar. ramidus engaged in upright walking, but not knuckle-walking. This leads to the conclusion that chimpanzees evolved knuckle-walking after they split from humans six million years ago, and humans evolved upright walking without knuckle-walking. This would imply that knuckle-walking evolved independently in the African great apes, which would mean a homoplasic (independent) evolution of this locomotor behaviour in gorillas and chimpanzees. However, other studies have argued the opposite by pointing out that the differences in knuckle-walking between gorillas and chimpanzees can be explained by differences in positional behaviour, kinematics, and the biomechanics of weight-bearing.

== Apes ==
Chimpanzees and gorillas engage in knuckle-walking. This form of hand-walking posture allows these tree-climbers to use their hands for terrestrial locomotion while retaining long fingers for gripping and climbing. It may also allow small objects to be carried in the fingers while walking on all fours. This is the most common type of movement for gorillas, although they also practice bipedalism.

Their knuckle-walking involves flexing the tips of their fingers and carrying their body weight down on the dorsal surface of their middle phalanges. The outer fingers are held clear off the ground. The wrist is held in a stable, locked position during the support phase of knuckle-walking by means of strongly flexed interphalangeal joints, and extended metacarpophalangeal joints. The palm, as a result, is positioned perpendicular to the ground and in line with the forearm. The wrist and elbow are extended throughout the last period in which the knuckle-walker's hand carried body weight.

Differences exist between knuckle-walking in chimpanzees and gorillas; juvenile chimpanzees engage in less knuckle-walking than juvenile gorillas. Another difference is that the hand bones of gorillas lack key features that were once thought to limit the extension of the wrist during knuckle-walking in chimpanzees. For example, the ridges and concavities features of the capitate and hamate bones have been interpreted to enhance stability of weight-bearing; on this basis, they have been used to identify knuckle-walking in fossils. These are found in all chimpanzees, but in only two out of five gorillas. They are also less prominent when found in gorillas. They are, however, found in primates that do not knuckle-walk.

Chimpanzee knuckle-walking and gorilla knuckle-walking have been suggested to be biomechanically and posturally distinct. Gorillas use a form of knuckle-walking that is "columnar". In this forelimb posture, the hand and wrist joints are aligned in a relatively straight, neutral posture. In contrast, chimpanzees use an extended wrist posture. These differences underlie the different characteristics of their hand bones.

The difference has been attributed to the greater locomotion of chimpanzees in trees, compared to gorillas. The former frequently engage in both knuckle-walking and palm-walking branches. As a result, to preserve their balance in trees, chimpanzees, like other primates in trees, often extended their wrists. This need has produced different wrist bone anatomy, and through this, a different form of knuckle-walking.

Knuckle-walking has been reported in some baboons. Fossils attributed to Australopithecus anamensis and Au. afarensis also may have had specialized wrist morphology that was retained from an earlier knuckle-walking ancestor.

=== Gorillas ===
Gorillas use the form of walking on all fours with the fingers on the hands of the front two limbs folded inward. A gorilla's forearm and wrist bones lock together to be able to sustain the weight of the animal and create a strong supporting structure. Gorillas use this form of walking because their hips are attached differently from humans, so standing on two legs for a long period of time would eventually become painful. Gorillas sometimes do walk upright in instances where dangers are present.

== Other mammals ==
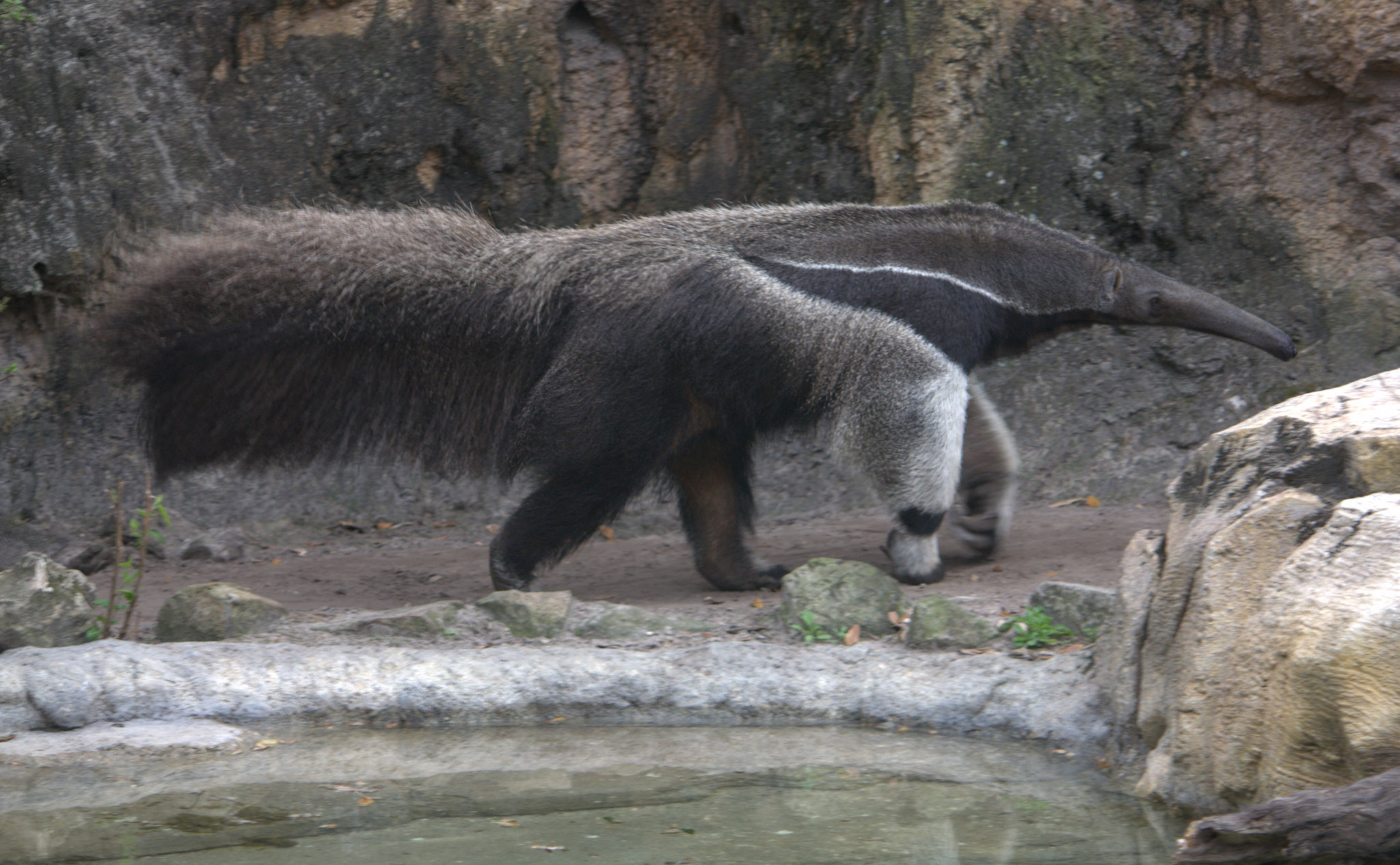
Giant anteater walking on its knuckles

Giant anteaters and platypuses are also knuckle-walkers. Pangolins also sometimes walk on their knuckles. Some members of the extinct ungulate family Chalicotheriidae with gorilla-like forelimbs are suggested to have knuckle-walked. Some ground sloths may have also walked on their knuckles.

== Reptiles ==
A quadrupedal or even knuckle-walking posture has been proposed for the theropod dinosaur Spinosaurus aegyptiacus based on reconstructions by Ibrahim. These studies described Spinosaurus as having unusually short hind limbs and a forward-shifted center of mass, which they suggested would have made habitual bipedal locomotion difficult and may have required the animal to walk on all fours on land. However, this interpretation has been widely questioned. Most scientists propose that Spinosaurus was probably a bipedal animal and was probably not a quadrupedal knuckle-walker.

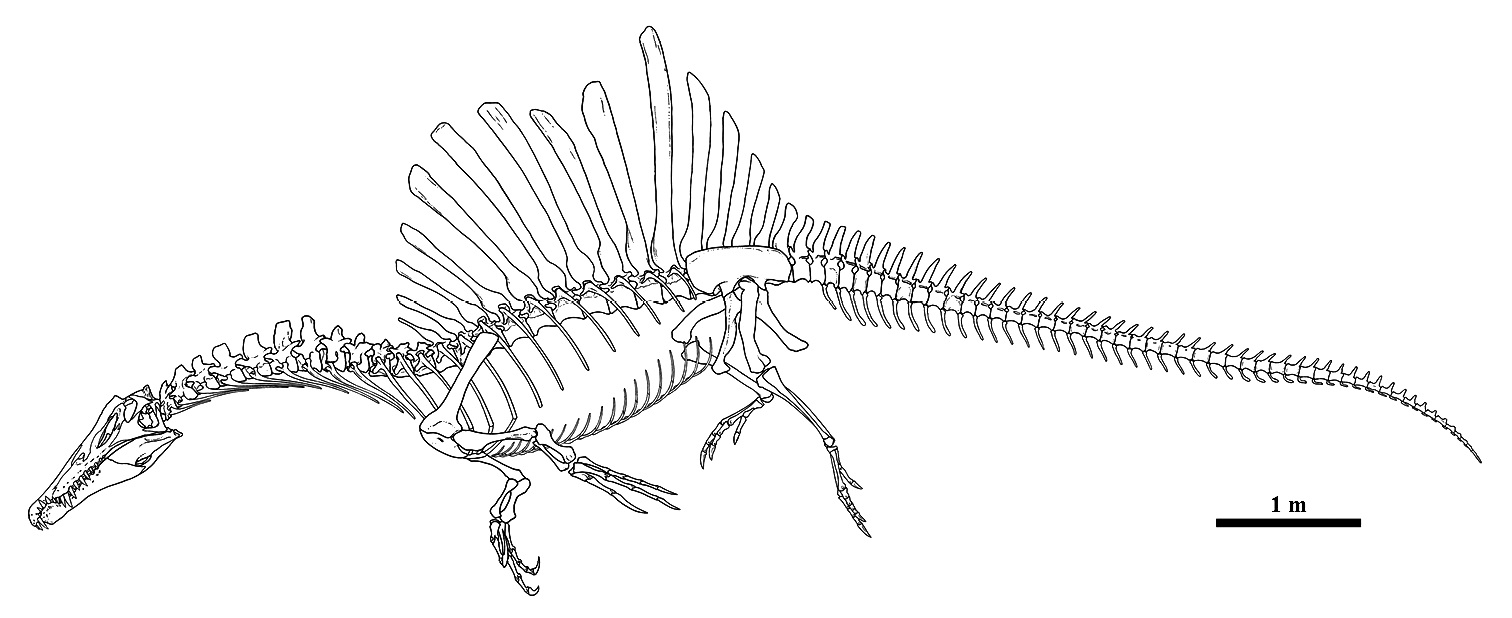
Skeletal reconstruction of Spinosaurus aegyptiacus made prior to 2020

== Advantages ==
Knuckle-walking tends to evolve when the fingers of the forelimb are specialized for tasks other than locomotion on the ground. In the gorilla, the fingers are used for the manipulation of food, and in chimpanzees, for the manipulation of food and climbing. In anteaters and pangolins, the fingers have large claws which enable opening the mounds of social insects. Platypus fingers have webbing that extend past the fingers; this aids in swimming, thus knuckle-walking is used to prevent stumbling.

Knuckle-walking of chimpanzees and gorillas, arguably, originally started from fist-walking as found in orangutans. African apes most likely diverged from ancestral arboreal apes (similar to orangutans) that were adapted to distribute their weight among tree branches and forest canopies. Adjustments made for terrestrial locomotion early on may have involved fist-walking, later evolving into knuckle-walking.

== Evolution of knuckle-walking ==
Competing hypotheses are given as to how knuckle-walking evolved as a form of locomotion, stemming from comparisons between African apes. High magnitudes of integration would indicate homoplasy of knuckle-walking in gorillas and chimpanzees, in which a trait is shared or similar between two species, but is not derived from a common ancestor. However, results show that they are not characterized by such high magnitudes, which does not support independent evolution of knuckle-walking. Similarities between gorillas and chimpanzees have been suggested to support a common origin for knuckle-walking, such as manual pressure distribution when practicing this form of locomotion. On the other hand, their behavioral differences have been hypothesized to suggest convergent evolution, or homoplasy.

Another hypothesis proposes that African apes came from a bipedal ancestor, as no differences in hemoglobin are seen between Pan and Homo, suggesting that their divergence occurred relatively recently. Examining protein sequence changes suggests that Gorilla diverged before the clade Homo-Pan, meaning that ancestral bipedalism would require parallel evolution of knuckle-walking in separate chimpanzee and gorilla radiations. The fact that chimpanzees practice both arboreal and knuckle-walking locomotion implies that knuckle-walking evolved from an arboreal ancestor as a solution for terrestrial travel, while still maintaining competent climbing skills.

Not all features associated with knuckle-walking are identical to the beings that practice it, as it suggests possible developmental differences. For example, brachiation and suspension are almost certainly homologous between siamangs and gibbons, yet they differ substantially in the relative growth of their locomotor skeletons. Differences in carpal growth are not necessarily a consequence of their function, as they could be related to differences in body mass, growth, etc. It is important to keep this in mind when examining similarities and differences between African apes themselves, as well as knuckle-walkers and humans, when developing hypotheses on locomotive evolution.

== Human evolution ==
One theory of the origins of human bipedality is that it evolved from a terrestrial knuckle-walking ancestor. This theory is opposed to the theory that such bipedalism arose from a more generalized arboreal ape ancestor. The terrestrial knuckle-walking theory argues that early hominin wrist and hand bones retain morphological evidence of early knuckle-walking. The argument is not that they were knuckle-walkers themselves, but that it is an example of "phylogenetic 'lag'". "The retention of knuckle-walking morphology in the earliest hominids indicates that bipedalism evolved from an ancestor already adapted for terrestrial locomotion. ... Pre-bipedal locomotion is probably best characterized as a repertoire consisting of terrestrial knuckle-walking, arboreal climbing and occasional suspensory activities, not unlike that observed in chimpanzees today". See Vestigiality. Crucial to the knuckle-walking ancestor hypothesis is the role of the os centrale in the hominoid wrist, since the fusion of this bone with the scaphoid is among the clearest morphological synapomorphies of hominins and African apes. It has been shown that fused scaphoid-centrales display lower stress values during simulated knuckle-walking as compared to non-fused morphologies, hence supporting a biomechanical explanation for the fusion as a functional adaptation to this locomotor behavior. This suggests that this wrist morphology was probably retained from a recent common ancestor that showed knuckle-walking as part of its locomotor repertoire and that was probably later exapted for other functions (e.g. to withstand the shear stress during power-grip positions). Nevertheless, it is relevant to keep in mind that extant knuckle-walkers display diverse positional behaviors, and that knuckle-walking does not preclude climbing or exclude the possible importance of arboreality in the evolution of bipedalism in the hominin lineage.

Knuckle-walking, though has been suggested to have evolved independently and separately in Pan and Gorilla, so was not present in the human ancestors. This is supported by the evidence that gorillas and chimpanzees differ in their knuckle-walking-related wrist anatomy and in the biomechanics of their knuckle-walking. Kivell and Schmitt note "Features found in the hominin fossil record that have traditionally been associated with a broad definition of knuckle-walking are more likely reflecting the habitual Pan-like use of extended wrist postures that are particularly advantageous in an arboreal environment. This, in turn, suggests that human bipedality evolved from a more arboreal ancestor occupying a generalized locomotor and ecological niche common to all living apes". Arguments for the independent evolution of knuckle-walking have not gone without criticism, however. Another study of morphological integration in human and great ape wrists suggests that knuckle-walking did not evolve independently in gorillas and chimpanzees, which "places the emergence of hominins and the evolution of bipedalism in the context of a knuckle-walking background."

== Related forms of hand-walking ==
Primates can walk on their hands in other ways than on their knuckles. They can walk on fists such as orangutans. In this form, body weight is borne on the back of the proximal phalanges.

Quadrupedal primate walking can be done on the palms. This occurs in many primates when walking on all fours on tree branches. It is also the method used by human infants when crawling on their knees or engaged in a "bear-crawl" (in which the legs are fully extended and weight is taken by the ankles). A few older children and some adults retain the ability to walk quadrupedally, even after acquiring bipedalism. A BBC2 and NOVA episode, "The Family That Walks on All Fours", reported on the Ulas family in which five individuals grew up walking normally upon the palms of their hands and fully extended legs due to a recessive genetic mutation that causes a nonprogressive congenital cerebellar ataxia that impairs the balance needed for bipedality. Not only did they walk on their palms of their hands, but they also could do so holding objects in their fingers.

Primates can also walk on their fingers. In olive baboons, rhesus macaques, and patas monkeys, such finger-walking turns to palm-walking when animals start to run. This has been suggested to spread the forces better across the wrist bones to protect them.
