= Sputnik Observatory =

Educational non-profit organization

Sputnik Observatory (SPTNK) is an educational non-profit organization that specializes in the study of contemporary culture. SPTNK documents, archives and disseminates ideas that are shaping modern thought. SPTNK has a website designed by Jonathan Harris that interconnects ideas in fields as diverse as quantum physics, mathematics, neuroscience, biology, economics, architecture, digital art, video games, computer science and music. Conversations include such people as physicist Freeman Dyson, game designer Will Wright, venture capitalist Jacques Vallée, biologist Lynn Margulis, aerospace entrepreneur Robert Bigelow, architect Lars Spuybroek and computer scientist Vint Cerf..

Sputnik Observatory was established and funded in New York City in 2003 by the principals of Sputnik Inc. Its goal is to encourage lifelong learning within a democratic space where people can listen and engage with ideas that inform contemporary history. Board Members include John Perry Barlow, Hiro Yamagata, Bruce Odland and Dorion Sagan.
