= Up from Dragons =

Book by John Skoyles and Dorion Sagan

Up from Dragons: The Evolution of Human Intelligence
- Up from Dragons cover
- Author: John Skoyles and Dorion Sagan
- Cover artist: Russell Farrell
- Language: English
- Publisher: McGraw-Hill
- Publication date: 2002
- Publication place: United States
- Media type: Print (Hardcover)
- Pages: 418 pp
- ISBN: 0-07-137825-1
- OCLC: 48588305
- Dewey Decimal: 155.7 21
- LC Class: BF431 .S558 2002

Up from Dragons: The Evolution of Human Intelligence is a 2002 book on human evolution, the human brain, and the origins of human cognition by John Skoyles and Dorion Sagan. The book considers how the brain and genes evolved into their present condition over the course of thousands and millions of years. It was published by McGraw Hill.

The book argues that the earlier ape brain had evolved “mindmakers” and that the human mind arose when these were “rewired” by symbols. This new “mindware” was created by the prefrontal cortex in combination with neural plasticity. This “Symbolic capacity is the ‘missing link’ that changed the ape brain into a human and made mindware possible, allowing symbols to structure the brain”.^{p. 277} Mindware itself has been evolving for the last 120,000 years and as a result kept reshaping human consciousness, thought and culture. Its last chapter speculates upon the future of human cognition.

The title relates to Carl Sagan (co-author Dorion Sagan's father) and his 1977 book The Dragons of Eden for which this book provides a 25th-anniversary reappraisal.

== Chapters ==
1. Cosmic Mirror: The questions of who and what humans are explored in terms of the history of the universe, life and humankind as when looking in a mirror.
2. Up from Dragons: Modern human genes arose when humans evolved as hunter-gatherers. But in the last 120,000 years humans have changed from hunter-gatherers to hi-tech citizens. The book seeks to answer why and how.
3. Neurons Unlimited: The brain is neurally plastic (NP) – evolution left open the function of human neurons. The capacity of its neurons to engage in imagination extends its potential to think and feel.
4. Superbrain: The prefrontal cortex (PC) is the brain's "conductor". It directs using inner representations as prompts which organize the brain's "orchestra" of neural “talents”.
5. Mind-Engine: Cognition depends upon brain waves that bind through synchronization of diverse brain areas into mental unity. The prefrontal cortex controls this unification of the brain.
6. Neural Revolution: The large sized human brain has extensive "blank" cortex available for processing nonevolved skills. But acquiring such skills requires that the brain’s neural networks get “trained”—which the prefrontal cortex does by acting as a “cortical catalyst”.
7. Machiavellian Neurons: Humans like other apes live in social groups that split and reform. Humans are novel in their ability to decouple these social and personal bonds from direct sensory contact. The human brain does this by carrying around its social group as an "inner troop within our heads".
8. The Troop within Our Heads: Humans think they are free—but this troop within their heads rules human thoughts, feelings and actions. Due to it humans feel guilt, shame, pride and self-consciousness.
9. Our Living Concern: Underlying human experience are mindmakers. One such mindmaker is the anterior cingulate as it creates attention to what is done. It underlies not only social consciousness, but pain, and a sense of reality.
10. Doing the Right Thing: Our sense of right and wrong arises from our origins as social apes. Morality is a byproduct of the troop within our heads that is created by the orbitofrontal cortex mindmaker. This limits human freedom by preventing psychopathic-like actions.
11. Where Memories are Made: The human sense of identity arises from the need of the brain to experience a past linked to the present. Here, the mindmaker is the hippocampus. It underlies memory and the sense of continuity of self, other and place.
12. What Are We?: Mindmakers are not consciousness but they make it possible. They become the consciousness of "I" and "will" by embodiment. The human brain embodies not only its body extension, but its “troop within its head” and the inner orchestration done by its prefrontal cortex.
13. Of Human Bonding: The change that turned apes into humans was the ability to decouple social and personal bonds from everyday contact. This allowed new kinds of bonds such as those of marriage, in-law kin, culture and religion.
14. The Symbolic Brain: Symbols enabled this decoupling of bonds. Symbols are cognitive stand-ins—a wedding ring stands in for a marriage bond. The prefrontal cortex generates symbols. This enabled hunter-gatherer genes to develop new forms of social life including that of modern people.
15. Lucy and Kanzi: The symbol making potential of the prefrontal cortex arose to enable extended family bonds across the African savannah. “Gifted environments” also arose created by adults so young brains could be helped to learn and enrich their minds with symbols.
16. The Runaway Species: Homo brains expanded to be good parents. Successful brains selected partners with brains with which they could best raise children. A runaway selection resulted between brain size, mate selection and skilled parenting.
17. The Billion-Hour Journey: That modern people are not hunter-gatherers is due to mindware – the mind expanding systems of symbols – that evolved in the last 120,000 years. The process started slow, but then “bootstrapped” itself and accelerated. It now underlies the thoughts and feelings of modern humans.
18. Third Millennium Brain: The rewriting of the brain's potentials that started in the past still continues. “Braintech” is arising and will enhance humans even more. It is suggested that humans knowing that their origins lie in their brains, rather than ancient myth, will gain Brain Rights and enter a new Era—that of the Brain.

== Concepts ==
The book introduces and argues for novel ideas in human evolution, neuroscience, social neuroscience and the humanities.

=== Human evolution ===
==== Gifted environments ====
These are the learning environments humans create. Components of a gifted environment include “a rich variety of representations”, a “stimulating learning environment”, and “’empowering environments’—ones which foster specific paths of development, an opportunity sometimes limited to brief windows of developmental time” It is proposed that such gifted environments are created by adult prefrontal cortex. The potential to create gifted environments predates humans and exists in chimpanzees. But they are limited because as adults chimpanzees lack time, cooperate only weakly and are under constant stress. It was the highly cooperative sociability of humans that allowed gifted environments to arise that could fully support cognitive development.

==== Human change bootstrapping problem ====
Bootstrapping concerns the paradox that the best way for something to occur is for it to already to be established. This problem has been identified in computer and cognitive science as an important obstacle: computers need to load programs to start but this is best done when they have already loaded the program for doing this; reading is easier to acquire once a person can already read. Cognitive development can be interpreted as the process by which cognitive systems sidestep and work around bootstrapping problems that would otherwise obstruct cognitive growth. The bootstrapping problem is proposed to explain why human cultural and technological developments often take so long to historically develop and then accelerate: the best circumstances for such innovations to flourish often arise only when they already exist.

==== Human ticket ====
All animal species except humans live in much the same biological manner in which they evolved. Humans in contrast have journeyed away from being simple hunter-gatherers to becoming citizens of hi-tech nation states. Biologically this is odd since modern people still basically have the same genes as their early hunter-gatherers ancestors. This raises the question of what had evolved, the ticket, in those early humans that gave them to the potential to change later on so radically.

==== NP + PC Formula ====
The evolution of human intelligence is expressed in a Neural Plasticity + Prefrontal Cortex formula that is progressively elaborated:

NP + PC + ape mind = human mind
NP + PC + fission-fusion ape social skills = human social symbols
NP + PC + ape sensory and motor skills = human nonsocial symbols
NP + PC + FF ape skills + symbols + 10^{9} hours = contemporary mind
NP + PC + mindware + braintech = future mind

=== Neuroscience ===
==== Cognitive stand-ins ====
Symbols adapt already evolved functions to create novel ones by replacing their evolved inputs and outputs with nonevolved representations. Reading and writing are such new functions that rewire the functions of visual, speech and other cortical areas by letters and logogram stand-ins.

==== Cortical catalyst ====
Chemical catalysts work by creating chemical bonds by bringing existing substances into reaction using intermediaries, and by temporal and spatial conjunction. The prefrontal cortex works similarly upon information processing happening elsewhere in the brain through creating working memory space. This space allows novel intermediary forms of association to be created and held together between different information processing systems in the brain. This process is essential to the formation of symbols and symbol based cognition.

==== Free cortex ====
Due to brain enlargement in humans, most of the human cerebral cortex lacks tightly evolved functions and so is open to acquire nonevolved skills. Even highly evolved cortical areas such as the primary visual and auditory cortices can to a surprising degree take on new functions. Semantics can develop in the visual cortex of those born blind, and vision can develop in the auditory cortex in experimental animals when retinal input is redirected into it. The association areas of the cerebral cortex lack the input constraints of primary areas. As a result, they are even more open to acquire novel cognitive capabilities.

==== Memory headers ====
John Morton has proposed that memories are organized by headed records. The function of the hippocampus is suggested to be providing such headers for memory. They also underlie the human capacity to experience in spite of superficial changes the continuity of self, other and place.

==== Pain as benevolent dictator ====
Pain is argued to be a protective attentive envelope (see below) that temporary acts to protect injured or easily injured parts of the body from actions controlled by the brain.

==== Protective attentive envelopes ====
Aircraft have flight envelope protection systems that stop pilots acting in a manner that might harm the aircraft but which allow them to make quick but safe actions. The anterior cingulate cortex is argued to act as a “hidden observer” over what we do “attention-to-action” and it provides a similar function for humans. These envelopes underlie the experience of self-consciousness, anxiety and pain.

=== Social neuroscience ===
==== Limbic symbolons ====
Symbolons were ancient Greek tokens or insignia by which people who were bonded could spot each other (the word comes from the Greek “symballein” which means “to throw together”). The problem of social primates is to create bonds that are flexible yet also allow prolonged separation. Limbic symbolons are symbols that enable emotional attachments established in other apes by smell, grooming and to some degree sight, to cope with physical separation by an internal (mental name) or external (wedding ring) stand-in that is always cognitively present. Limbic symbols are usually publicly defined (another advantage) and acquired in rituals. “Early hominid environments were dangerous and food resources patchy and irregular, which placed a premium on individuals able to exploit kin relations and extend social links beyond the immediate present. Such pressures promoted symbolism, originally to stand for kin recognition and social relationships, enabling these to be maintained over time and space even when the relevant individuals were absent. These developments in turn lead to more complex social networks and the cognitive abilities to exploit these.”

==== Nonimmediate sociability ====
Two kinds of sociability exist: immediate and nonimmediate. The former depends upon sensory interaction with others such as smell, touch, sound or vision. Nonimmediate depends upon carrying the experience of the group within the head. Such sociability is already present in apes and is due to processes called mindmakers. But due to the modification of these mindmakers with symbolons, sociability in groups has become highly developed in humans. The combination of symbols and mindmakers created social mindware.

==== Mindmakers ====
These are “processes that weave this sense we all have of being a ‘me. .. give existence its animated feel, the feeling of being alive. They are clues to understanding such things as our freedom and the links between the prefrontal cortex’s inner cues and our hidden sociability’”. Mindmakers evolved to enable animals to remain part of a social group when separated. Mindmaker processes are identified in the anterior cingulate cortex (protective attentive envelopes), hippocampus (continuity), orbitofrontal cortex (social right and wrong). Mindmakers are present in other animals but only in humans have they become extensively elaborated. They also provide the neural substrate for cultural symbolism and so the human ability to sustain socially defined groups and personal bonds.

==== Mindware ====
Mindware is the symbolic counterpart of mindmakers. The concept differs from that of memes in the way that the descriptive notion of a “bridge” differs from that of specified engineering types of bridges (suspension, cantilever, arch and so on). In the latter, what transmits is understood in terms of the specific engineering processes that support that transmission rather than the general idea of transmission. The use of a wedding ring is a meme when viewed from the perspective of transmitted culture, but it is mindware when viewed from the neurological changes it makes to the attachment processes in the brain that sustain the emotional bond of marriage. The acquisition of social mindware is closely linked with rituals. In mindware “the human ape found a brain programming language to bond across time and place—symbolic culture. This was to change forever what it meant to be a brain. Now the human mind could live in thousands of varieties of life. …with their mindware humans set themselves apart from other animals and the rest of nature”.

==== Social embodiment ====
The subjective sense of embodiment in our extended physical body relates to its capacity to act through it and so interact with the autonomous physical world. The human brain also acts within the autonomous world of social relationships. This social embodiment gives rise to a sense of social “me” . Consciousness is the embodied attention of the brain to its causality in such social relationships and the physical world.

==== Superfission-fusion ape ====
The sociability of social apes is fission-fusion. In this members of a group regularly separate into small subgroups (fission) but at the same time still belong to the same group (fusion). Human are unique in the robust ability of their bonds to survive prolonged physical separation. This is due to symbols. Another factor is that these bonds can be publicly defined and so create symbolic culture. This makes humans a superfission-fusion ape.

=== Humanities ===
==== Brain Age ====
The Era that will follow the present one will be the Brain Age. In this neuroscience will replace the ancient myths that at present shape how people understand themselves. Further, braintech (see below) will arise that enables humans to reshape the competences of their brain. This Era will continue the reshaping of our species that has happened since its origins 120,000 years ago. Braintech represents the last frontier faced by the human species.

==== Brain Rights ====
Humans are social primates who use superficial differences (such as skin pigmentation) or symbols based upon ancient myth to identify their group membership. Brains offer a firmer foundation for our identity since they underlie the core of who we are in our shared “vulnerability, richness, history, and giftedness”. Understanding this is our true nature. It follows that “Each of our brains should be guaranteed the right to grow unhandicapped and supplied with the best possible nurture and support”, and “a gifted environment sensitive to its uniqueness”.

==== Braintech ====
Humans from early on when using stone tools have created technologies that have enhanced their abilities. This will continue with the still unexplored potential of the brain. One area is awareness of its hidden functioning as this is needed to better train it. The future of present functional imaging is proposed to be akin to that of computers as in the 1960s. Like such past computers such technology will spiral down in price and convenience so that this braintech (like computers today) will become an essential part of everyday human life.

== Criticisms ==
- Fails to link with earlier work upon “cognitive ergonomics”.^{p. 143}
- The description of the prefrontal cortex “begs for more commentary on their likely causes, consequences, and context”.^{p. 143}
- Fails to discuss helping behavior before “primate or even mammalian sociality emerged”.^{p. 144}
- Should have explored cost/benefits of sociosexual selection.^{p. 146}
- Lacks “an unambiguous definition of mindware … the resemblance to (if not identity with) ‘culture’ needs to be explored”.^{p. 146}
- The field of psychoneuroendocrinology and the developmental forces such as sensitive periods and behavior genetics is neglected.^{p. 147}
- Its account of consciousness which depends upon coherence does not explain “possession, dissociation, out-of-body experiences and addictions”.^{p. 279}
- “The authors seem to fall all too easily into a simplistic materialism”.^{p. 279}
- The notion of Brain Age is wrong: “It is not the brain age, but the mind age, the culture age, the dawning realization of our capacity to program our brain to do many different things.^{p. 279}
- Lacks anatomical and flowchart illustrations.
- Does not discuss the work of Leda Cosmides and John Tooby nor Steven Mithen.

== See also ==
- Behavioral modernity
- Evolution of human intelligence
- Human condition
- Human nature
- Memes
- Nature versus nurture
- Tabula rasa
- Triune brain
- Symbolic Species by Terrence Deacon
- Blank Slate by Steven Pinker

== Editions ==
- Skoyles, J. R. and Sagan, D. (2003) Il drago nello specchio. L'evoluzione dell'intelligenza umana dal big bang al terzo millennio. Sironi, Milan, ISBN 978-88-518-0023-9
