= Dorion Sagan =

American science writer, essayist and theorist (born 1959)

- Born: 1959 (age 66–67)
- Occupations: Essayist; author
- Parents: Carl Sagan (father); Lynn Margulis (mother)
- Relatives: Nick Sagan (half-brother); Sasha Sagan (half-sister)

Dorion Sagan (born 1959) is an American essayist, fiction writer, poet, and theorist of ecology. He has written and co-authored books on culture, art, literature, evolution, and the history and philosophy of science, including Cosmic Apprentice, Cracking the Aging Code, and Lynn Margulis: The Life and Legacy of a Scientific Rebel (the last, about his mother).

His book Into the Cool, co-authored with Eric D. Schneider, is about the relationship between non-equilibrium thermodynamics and life.

Sagan's works have been translated into 15 languages and are widely cited in critical theory since The Nonhuman Turn, in New materialism, and in feminist science studies.

Sagan is a son of astronomer Carl Sagan and biologist Lynn Margulis. He has four siblings. His half-brother Nick Sagan is a science-fiction writer.

== Bibliography ==
=== Books ===
- Livro de seres invisiveis (2021) ISBN 978-65-88069-03-5
- Cosmic Apprentice: Dispatches from the Edges of Science (2013) ISBN 978-0-8166-8135-8
- Lynn Margulis: The Life and Legacy of a Scientific Rebel (2012, Sciencewriters Books) ISBN 978-1-60358-446-3
- Death and Sex (two-in-one book with Tyler Volk, 2009) ISBN 978-1-60358-143-1
- Biospheres: Metamorphosis of Planet Earth (1990) ISBN 978-0-07-054426-0
- Notes from the Holocene: A Brief History of the Future (2007) ISBN 978-1-933392-32-5
- Cooking with Jesus: From the Primal Brew to the Last Brunch (2001) ISBN 978-1-58898-160-8
- The Sciences of Avatar (2010) ASIN B004089DDI

==== Co-written with Lynn Margulis ====
- Microcosmos: Four Billion Years of Evolution from Our Microbial Ancestors (1986) ISBN 978-0-671-44169-2
- Origins of Sex: Three Billion Years of Genetic Recombination (1986) ISBN 978-0-300-04619-9
- Garden of Microbial Delights: A Practical Guide to the Subvisible World (1988) ISBN 978-0-7872-0136-4
- Biospheres from Earth to Space ISBN 978-0-89490-188-1 (1989)
- Mystery Dance: On the Evolution of Human Sexuality ISBN 978-0-671-79226-8 (1991)
- What Is Sex? ISBN 978-0-684-82691-2 (1995)
- What Is Life? (1995) ISBN 978-0-684-81087-4
- Slanted Truths: Essays on Gaia, Symbiosis, and Evolution (1997)
- Acquiring Genomes: A Theory of the Origins of Species (2002) ISBN 978-0-465-04392-7
- Dazzle Gradually: Reflections on the Nature of Nature (2007) ISBN 978-1-933392-31-8

==== Co-written with Eric D. Schneider ====
- Into the Cool: Energy Flow, Thermodynamics, and Life (2005) ISBN 978-0-226-73936-6

==== Co-written with others ====
- Cracking the Aging Code: The New Science of Growing Old - And What It Means for Staying Young (2016 - with Josh Mitteldorf)
- Up From Dragons: The Evolution of Human Intelligence (2002 - with John Skoyles)
- Within the Stone: Nature's Abstract Rock Art (2004 - partial text to book of photographs by Bill Atkinson)
- Atheist Universe: The Thinking Person's Answer to Christian Fundamentalism (2006 - foreword to book by David Mills)
- Darwin's Unfinished Business: The Self-Organizing Intelligence of Nature (2011 - with Simon G Powell)

=== Essays ===
- "Möbius Trip: The Technosphere and Our Science Fiction Reality" Technosphere Magazine (2017)
- "Metametazoa: Biology and Multiplicity" (1992 - In Incorporations: Fragments for a History of the Human Body, Jonathan Crary and Sanford Kwinter, editors, Zone, pp. 362–385)
- "Partial closure: Dorion Sagan reflects on Carl" (1997 - Whole Earth, summer, pp. 34–37)
- "Gender Specifics: Why Women Aren't Men" (1998 - The New York Times )
- "The Beast with Five Genomes" (2001 - with Lynn Margulis - Natural History June, pp. 38–41)
- "The Postman Already Always Rings Twice: Fragments for an Understanding of the Future" (2004 Cabinet: A Quarterly of Art and Culture, pp. 23–27)
- "Gradient-Reduction Theory: Thermodynamics and the Purpose of Life" (2004 - with Jessica H. Whiteside. In Scientists Debate Gaia: The Next Century MIT Press)
- "A Brief History of Sex" (2007 - Cosmos [Australia], June/July, pp. 50–55)
- "Evolution, Complexity, and Energy Flow" (2008 - Back to Darwin: A Richer Account of Evolution John B. Cobb Jr., Editor, William B. Eerdmans Publishing Company, pp. 145–156)
- "What is the Cultural Relevance of Bacteria?" (2009 - Sputnik Observatory)

=== Short stories ===
- "The Tchaikovsky Dream Continuum" Cabinet, Issue 54 The Accident (Summer 2014)
- "The New Age Witch" (1993) After Hours, #19, summer, pp. 36–45
- "Love's Strangers" (2006) Meat for Tea: The Northampton Review, summer, Vol. 1, Issue 3, "Flesh," pp. 3–10
- "Semi-Naked" (2006) Meat for Tea: The Northampton Review, winter, Vol. 1, Issue 1, "Gristle," pp. 5–24

== Awards and honors ==
- First place, Silent Mora Ring 122 International Brotherhood of Magicians – 1974
- EdPress Excellence in Educational Journalism Award, Nonprofit National – 1986
- Humana Scholarship – Centre College Danville, Kentucky (2003)
- Lindisfarne Fellowship – Lindisfarne (2008 –)
- Advisory Board – Sputnik Inc (2009 –)
