= The Nonhuman Turn =

The Nonhuman Turn describes a late 20th and 21st century movement within the arts, humanities and social sciences, as practitioners of these disciplines turn away from the Social Constructivism of the earlier 20th century, in favour of emergent philosophies which seek to decenter the human, and to emphasize instead the agency of the nonhuman world. The phrase is adopted by Richard Grusin in his introduction to a collection of essays of the same name, based on the proceedings of the 2012 conference on the Nonhuman Turn, hosted by the Center for 21st Century Studies at the University of Wisconsin-Milwaukee.

== Constituent Philosophies ==
The nonhuman turn is not a homogeneous movement. Instead it should be thought of as an umbrella term covering a number of developments in philosophy and critical theory across a range of disciplines. The key constituents of this wider movement include:

- Animal studies
- New materialism
- Object-oriented ontology
