= Obstetrical dilemma =

Hypothesis about human childbirth

The obstetrical dilemma is a hypothesis to explain why humans often require assistance from other humans during childbirth to avoid complications, whereas most non-human primates give birth unassisted with relatively little difficulty. This occurs due to the tight fit of the fetal head to the maternal birth canal, which is additionally convoluted, meaning the head and therefore body of the infant must rotate during childbirth in order to fit, unlike in other, non-upright walking mammals. Consequently, there is an unusually high incidence of cephalopelvic disproportion and obstructed labor in humans.

The obstetrical dilemma claims that this difference is due to the biological trade-off imposed by two opposing evolutionary pressures in the development of the human pelvis: smaller birth canals in the mothers, and larger brains, and therefore skulls in the babies. Proponents believe bipedal locomotion (the ability to walk upright) decreased the size of the bony parts of the birth canal. They also believe that as hominids' and humans' skull and brain sizes increased over the millennia, that women needed wider hips to give birth, that these wider hips made women inherently less able to walk or run than men, and that babies had to be born earlier to fit through the birth canal, resulting in the so-called fourth trimester period for newborns (being born when the baby seems less developed than in other animals). Recent evidence has suggested that bipedal locomotion is only a part of the strong evolutionary pressure constraining the expansion of the maternal birth canal. In addition to bipedal locomotion, the reduced strength of the pelvic floor due to a wider maternal pelvis also leads to fitness detriments in the mother, pressuring the birth canal to remain relatively narrow.

This idea was widely accepted when first published in 1960, but has since been criticized by other scientists.

== History ==
The term, obstetrical dilemma, was coined in 1960, by Sherwood Larned Washburn, a prominent early American physical anthropologist, in order to describe the evolutionary development of the human pelvis and its relation to childbirth and pregnancy in hominids and non-human primates. In the intervening decades, the term has been used broadly among anthropologists, biologists, and other scientists to describe aspects of this hypothesis and related topics.

== Evolution of human birth ==
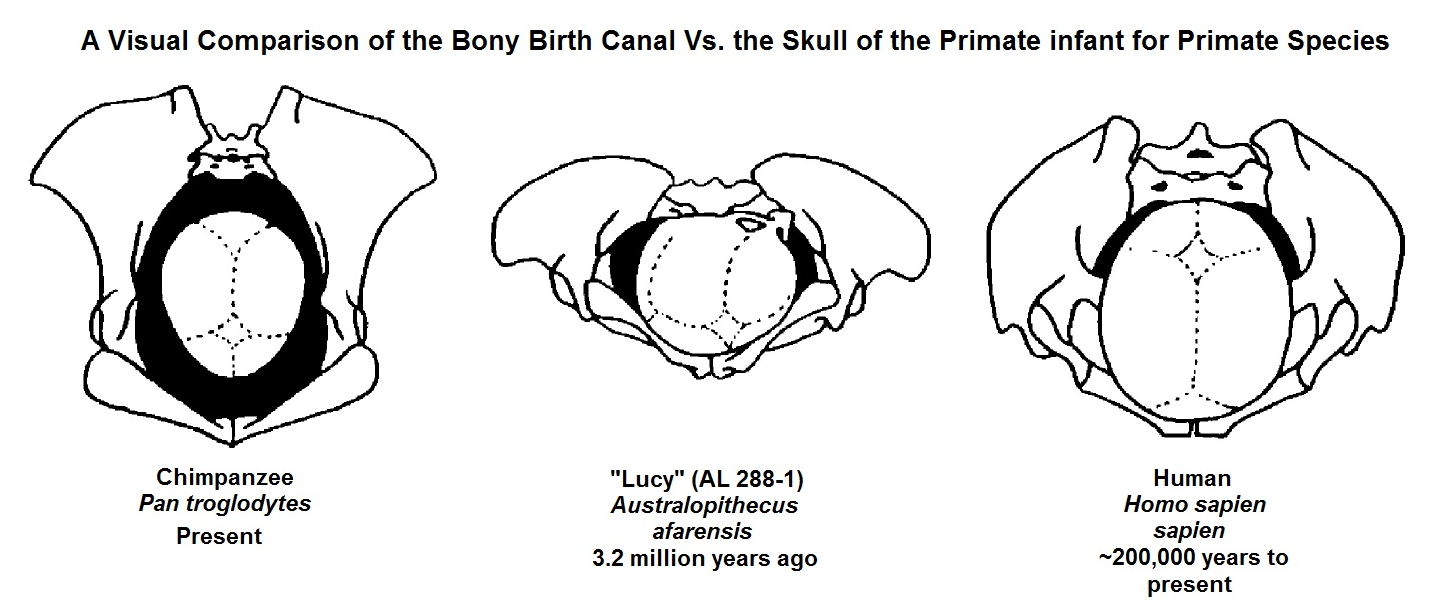
The diagram compares the size and shape of the pelvis as the infant's skull must move through it for the Chimpanzee, Australopithecus afarensis and Homo sapiens sapiens. This comparison is one of the pieces of evidence physical anthropologists use to support the Obstetrical Dilemma hypothesis

=== Human pelvis ===
The obstetrical dilemma hypothesizes that when hominids began to develop bipedal locomotion, the conflict between these two opposing evolutionary pressures became greatly exacerbated. Because humans are currently the only recognized extant obligately bipedal primates, meaning the body shape requires to only use two legs, major evolutionary developments had to occur in order to alter the shape of the female pelvis. Human males evolved narrower hips optimized for locomotion, whereas female hips evolved to be a wider optimization because of childbirthing needs. Human pelves have no gross distinguishing skeletal markers for sex before puberty. With puberty, hormones alter the shape of the pelvis in females to cater to obstetrical demands. Overall, through the evolution of the species, a number of structures in the body have changed size, proportion, or location in order to accommodate bipedal locomotion and allow a person to stand upright and face forward. To help support the upper body, a number of structural changes were made to the pelvis. The ilial pelvic bone shifted forward and broadened, while the ischial pelvic bone shrank, narrowing the pelvic canal. These changes were occurring at the same time as humans were developing larger craniums.

==== Male versus female ====
A male pelvis (left) compared to a female pelvis (right) from a posterolateral view. Differences in the sciatic notch and overall shape of the ilium can be observed.

Examination of the pelvis is the most useful method for identifying biological sex through the skeleton. Distinguishing features between the human male and female pelvis stem from the selective pressures of childbearing and birth. Females must be able to carry out the process of childbirth but also be able to move bipedally. The human female pelvis has evolved to be as wide as possible while still being able to allow bipedal locomotion. The compromise between these two necessary functions of the female pelvis can be especially seen through the comparative skeletal anatomy between males and females. The human pelvis is made up of three sections: the hip bones (ilium, ischium and pubis), the sacrum, and the coccyx. How these three segments articulate and what their dimensions are is key for differentiation between males and females. Females acquired the characteristic of the overall pelvic bone being thinner and denser than the pelvic bones of males. The female pelvis has also evolved to be much wider and allow for greater room in order to safely deliver a child. After sexual maturation, it can be observed that the pubic arch in females is generally an obtuse angle (between 90 and 100 degrees), while males tend to have more of an acute angle (approximately 70 degrees). This difference in angles can be attributed to the fact that the overall pelvis for a female is preferred to be wider and more open than a male pelvis. Another key difference can be seen in the sciatic notch. The sciatic notch in females tends to be wider than the sciatic notches of males. The pelvic inlet is also a key difference. The pelvic inlet can be observed as oval-shaped in females and more of a heart-shape in males. The difference in inlet shape is related to the distance between the ischium bones of the pelvis. To allow for a wider and more oval-shaped inlet, female ischium bones are further apart from one another than the ischium bones of a male.

Differences in the sacrum between males and females can also be attributed to the needs of childbirth. The female sacrum is wider than the male sacrum. The female sacrum can also be observed as being shorter than the sacrum of a male. The difference in width can be explained by the overall wider shape of the female pelvis. The female sacrum is also more curved posteriorly. This could be explained by the need for as much space as possible for a birthing canal. The articulating coccyx in females is also generally observed as being straighter and more flexible than the coccyx of a male for the same reason. Because of the female pelvic bones in general being further apart from one another than those of the male pelvis, the acetabula in a female are positioned more medially and further apart from one another. It is this orientation that allows for the stereotypical swinging motion of a female's hips while walking. The acetabula not only differ in distance, but in depth as well. It has been found that female acetabula have a greater depth than those in males, but are also paired with a smaller femoral head. This in turn creates a more stable hip joint(insert). One of the last key differences can be seen in the auricular surface of the pelvic bones. The auricular surface where the sacroiliac joint articulates seen in females generally has a rougher texture compared to the surfaces seen in males. This difference in the texture of the articulating surface may be due to the differences in shape of the sacrum between males and females. These key differences can be examined and used to determine biological sex between two different sets of pelvic bones; all due to the need for bipedal locomotion while having the need for childbearing and childbirth in females.

=== Adaptations to ensure live birth ===
Early human ancestors, hominids, originally gave birth in a similar way that non-human primates do because early obligate quadrupedal individuals would have retained a similar skeletal structure to great apes. Most non-human primates today have neonatal heads that are close in size to the mother's birth canal, as evidenced by observing female primates who do not need assistance in birthing, often seeking seclusion away from others of their species. In modern humans, parturition (childbirth) differs greatly from the rest of the primates because of both the pelvic shape of the mother and the neonatal shape of the infant. Further adaptations evolved to cope with bipedalism and larger craniums were also important such as neonatal rotation of the infant, shorter gestation length, assistance with birth, and a malleable neonatal head.

==== Neonatal rotation ====
Neonatal rotation was a solution for humans evolving larger brain sizes. Comparative zoological analysis has shown that the size of the human brain is anomalous, as humans have brains that are significantly larger than other animals of similar proportions. Even among the great apes, humans are distinctive in this regard, having brains three to four times larger than those of chimpanzees, humans' nearest relatives. Although the close correspondence between the neonatal cranium and the maternal pelvis in monkeys is also characteristic of humans, the orientation of the pelvic diameters differs. On average, a human fetus is nearly twice as large in relation to its mother's weight as would be expected for another similarly sized primate. The extremely close correspondence between the fetal head and the maternal pelvic dimensions requires that these dimensions line up at all points (inlet, midplane, and outlet) during the birth process. During delivery, neonatal rotation occurs when the body gets rotated to align head and shoulders transversely when entering the small pelvis, otherwise known as internal rotation. The fetus then rotates longitudinally to exit the birth canal, which is known as external rotation. In humans, the long axes of the inlet and the outlet of the obstetric canal lie perpendicular to each other. This is an important mechanism because growth in the size of the cranium as well as the width of the shoulders makes it more difficult for the infant to fit through the pelvis. This enables the largest dimensions of the fetal head to align with the largest dimensions of each plane of the maternal pelvis as labor progresses. This differs in non-human primates as there is no need for neonatal rotation in non-human primates because the birth canal is wide enough to accommodate the infant. This elaborate mechanism of labor, which requires a constant readjustment of the fetal head in relation to the bony pelvis (and which may vary somewhat depending on the shape of the pelvis in question), is completely different from the obstetrical mechanics of the other higher primates whose infants generally drop through the pelvis without any rotation or realignment. In contrast to the narrow shoulders of monkeys and higher primates, which are able to pass through the birth canal without any rotation, modern humans have broad, rigid shoulders, which generally require the same series of rotations that the head undergoes in order to travel through.

Due to the evolution of bipedalism in humans, the pelvis had evolved to have a shorter, more forward-curved ilium and a broader sacrum in order to support ambulating on two legs. This caused the birth canal to shrink and form a more oval shape, thus the infant must undergo specific movements to rotate itself in a certain position to be able to pass through the pelvis. These movements are referred to as the seven cardinal movements, which the infant rotates itself at the widest diameter of the pelvis to allow for the narrowest aspect of the fetal body to align with the narrowest diameter of the pelvis. These movements include engagement, descent, flexion, internal rotation, extension, external rotation, and expulsion.

1. Engagement is the first movement of labor, where the first part of the head enters the pelvic inlet.
2. Descent refers to the deeper movement of the head through the pelvic inlet with the widest diameter of the infant's head.
3. Flexion occurs during descent, where tissues of the pelvis create resistance as the head moves down the pelvic cavity and brings the infant's chin to the chest. This allows for the smallest part of the head to begin to push through the pelvis and actively promote delivery of the baby.
4. Internal rotation occurs when the head continues to descend and comes in contact with the pelvic floor, which has resistant muscles. These muscles allow for the infant to rotate their head to allow their head and shoulders to move through the pelvis. Due to the broad shape of the sacrum, the head of the fetus must be rotated from occiput transverse to occiput anterior position, which means the infant must rotate from the sideways position so the anterior head faces the buttock of the mother.
5. Extension is the point where the head moves past the pubic symphysis, where it has to curve underneath the birth canal while the anterior head still faces the mother's bottom.
6. External rotation (or Restitution) occurs when the baby pauses after the head passes through the body. During this pause, the infant rotates itself sideways (facing the mother's thigh) to allow for the shoulder to fit through the birth canal.
7. Expulsion is the final step of labor. During this stage, the anterior shoulder moves past the birth canal first then the posterior shoulder. Once both shoulders are out, the baby is delivered through the birth canal completely.

While the seven cardinal movements are considered the normal mechanism for labor and delivery of human babies, pelvic sizes and shapes can vary among female humans, which can increase the risk of errors in rotations and delivery, especially since these movements are done completely by the baby. One of the biggest issues with the pelvic shape for childbirth is the ischial spine. Since the ischial spines support the pelvic floor, if the spines are too far apart, it can lead to weakened pelvic floor muscles. This can cause issues as pregnancy progresses, such as difficulty carrying the fetus to full term. Another complication that can occur during human childbirth is shoulder dystocia, where the shoulder is stuck in the birth canal. This can lead to a fractured humerus and clavicle of the fetus and hemorrhaging of the mother postpartum. Thus, these neonatal rotations are important in allowing the baby to safely pass through the pelvis and ensure the health of the mother as well.

==== Gestation length and altriciality ====
Gestation length in humans is believed to be shorter than most other primates of comparable size. The gestation length for humans is 266 days, or eight days short of nine months, which is counted from the first day of the woman's last menstrual period. During gestation, mothers must support the metabolic cost of tissue growth, both of the fetus and the mother, as well as the ever-increasing metabolic rate of the growing fetus. Comparative data from across mammals and primates suggest that there is a metabolic constraint on how large and energetically expensive a fetus can grow before it must leave the mother's body. It is thought that this shorter gestation period is an adaptation to ensure the survival of mother and child because it leads to altriciality. Neonatal brain and body size have increased in the hominin lineage, and human maternal investment is greater than expected for a primate of similar body mass. The obstetrical dilemma hypothesis suggests that in order to successfully undergo childbirth, the infant must be born earlier and earlier, thereby making the child increasingly developmentally premature. The concept of the infant being born underdeveloped is called altriciality. Humans are born with an underdeveloped brain; only 25% of their brains are fully developed at birth, as opposed to non-human primates, where the infant is born with 45–50% brain development. Scientists have believed that the shorter gestation period can be attributed to the narrower pelvis, as the baby must be born before its head reaches a volume that cannot be accommodated by the obstetric canal.

==== Social assistance ====
Human infants are also almost always born with assistance from other humans because of the way that the pelvis is shaped. Since the pelvis and opening of the birth canal face backwards, humans have difficulty giving birth themselves because they cannot guide the baby out of the canal. Non-human primates seek seclusion when giving birth because they do not need any help due to the pelvis and opening being more forward. There is no evidence to ascertain at what point in human evolution birth assistance arose, but some researchers have suggested Homo habilis. Human infants depend on their parents much more and for much longer than other primates. Humans spend a lot of their time caring for their children as they develop whereas other species stand on their own from when they are born. The faster an infant develops, the higher the reproductive output of a female can be. So in humans, the cost of slow development of their infants is that humans reproduce relatively slowly. This phenomenon is also known as cooperative breeding.

==== Malleable cranium ====
Humans are born with a very malleable fetal head which is not fully developed when the infant exits the womb. This soft spot on the crown of the infant allows for the head to be compressed in order to better fit through the birth canal without obstructing it. This allows for the head to develop more after birth and for the cranium to continue growing without affecting the birthing process.

== Challenges to the obstetrical dilemma hypothesis ==
The obstetrical dilemma hypothesis has had several challenges to it, as more data is collected and analyzed. Several different fields of study have taken an interest in understanding more about the human birth process and that of human ancestor species.

=== Early brain growth rates ===
Some studies have shown that higher brain growth rates happen earlier on in ontogeny than previously thought, which challenges the idea that the explanation of the obstetrical dilemma is that humans are born with underdeveloped brains. This is because if brain growth rates were largest in early development, that is when the brain size would increase the most. Premature birth would not allow for a much larger head size if most of the growth had already happened. Also, it has been suggested that maternal pelvic dimensions are sensitive to some ecological factors.

=== Maternal heat stress ===
There has been a lot of evidence linking body mass to brain mass, leading to the determination of maternal metabolism as a key factor in the growth of the fetus. Maternal constraints could be largely due to thermal stress or energy availability. A larger brain mass in the neonate corresponds to more energy needed to sustain it. It takes much more energy for the mother if the brain fully develops in the womb. If maternal energy is the limiting factor, then an infant can only grow as much as the mother can sustain. Also, because fetal size is positively correlated to maternal energy use, thermal stress is an issue because the larger the fetus, the more the mother can suffer heat stress.

=== Environmental effects ===
Additional studies suggest that other factors may further complicate the obstetrical dilemma hypothesis. One of these is dietary shifts, possibly due to the emergence of agriculture. This can be both due to change in diet as well as the increase in population density since agriculture was developed; more people leads to more disease. Studies have also been done in twins to show that pelvic size may be due more to the environment in which they live than their genetics. Another study disproves the thought that narrower hips are optimized for locomotion because it was found that a Late Stone Age population in Southern Africa that survived largely on terrestrial mobility had women who had uncharacteristically small body size with large pelvic canals.

=== Energetics of gestation and growth hypothesis ===
The energetics of gestation and growth (EGG) hypothesis offers a direct challenge to the obstetrical dilemma hypothesis, equating the constraints on gestation and parturition to the energy restrictions of the mother. It has been shown in studies using professional athletes and pregnant women, that there is an upper limitation to the amount of energy a woman can produce before it causes deleterious effects: approximately 2.1x their basal metabolic rate. During pregnancy, the growing brain mass and length in the neonate correspond to more energy needed to sustain it. This results in a competing balance between the fetus's demand for energy and the maternal ability to meet that demand. At approximately nine months gestation, the fetus's energy needs surpass the mother's energy limitation, correlating with the average time of birth. The newly born infant can then be sustained on breast milk, which is a more efficient, less energy-demanding mechanism of nutrient transfer between mother and child. Additionally, this hypothesis demonstrates that, contrary to the obstetrical dilemma, an increased pelvic size would not be deleterious to bipedalism. Studying the running mechanics of males and females, it was shown that an increased pelvic size related to neither an increased metabolic nor structural demand on a woman.

=== Obstetrical dilemma revisited ===
The obstetrical dilemma hypothesis has also been challenged conceptually based on new studies. The authors argue that the obstetrical dilemma hypothesis assumes that human, and therefore hominid, childbirth has been a painful and dangerous experience through the species' evolution. This assumption may be fundamentally false as many early analyses focused on maternal death data from primarily females of European-descent in Western Europe and the United States during the 19th and 20th century, a limited population. In a recent study, a covariation between human pelvis shape, stature, and head size is reported. It is said that females with a large head possess a birth canal that can better accommodate large-headed neonates. Mothers with large heads usually give birth to neonates with large heads. Therefore, the detected pattern of covariation contributes to ease childbirth and has likely evolved in response to strong correlational selection. A recent study aimed to evaluate the original ideas under the 'obstetrical dilemma' and provide a detailed, more complex explanation for the tight fetopelvic fit observed in humans. They propose that the original obstetrical dilemma hypothesis remains valuable as a foundation to explain the complex combination of evolutionary, ecological, and biocultural pressures that constrain maternal pelvic form and fetal size.

== See also ==
- Solitary birth
