= John Skoyles (scientist) =

John Robert Skoyles is a neuroscientist and evolutionary psychologist. He studied philosophy of science at the London School of Economics and then did MRC funded research upon neuroscience and dyslexia at University College London.

He published a letter while a first year undergraduate in the science journal Nature on the left lateralizing role of the Greek alphabet and the origins of Greek and Western civilization. He is the coauthor of a book, Up from Dragons: The Evolution of Human Intelligence with Dorion Sagan upon the role of neural plasticity, the prefrontal cortex, symbols upon human evolution and the rise of modern human cognition. Being himself a dyslexic, he has written about the development of dyslexia and neural networks, and the role of the brain in dyslexia.

In 2004 he initiated and was a consultant for the BBC documentary The Family That Walks On All Fours that reported on the Ulas family, the first humans reported that could not walk bipedally but who were proficient quadrupedal runners and walkers.

He is a member of the Centre for Mathematics and Physics in the Life Sciences and Experimental Biology at University College London and the Centre for Philosophy of Natural and Social Science at the London School of Economics.
