= VLDLR-associated cerebellar hypoplasia =

- Other names: Dysequilibrium syndrome, DES; Nonprogressive cerebellar disorder with mental retardation)

VLDLR-associated cerebellar hypoplasia (VLDLRCH) is a rare autosomal recessive condition caused by a disruption of the VLDLR gene. First described as a form of cerebral palsy in the 1970s, it is associated with parental consanguinity and is found in secluded communities, with a number of cases described in Hutterite families.
