= Quadrupedalism =

Form of locomotion using four limbs

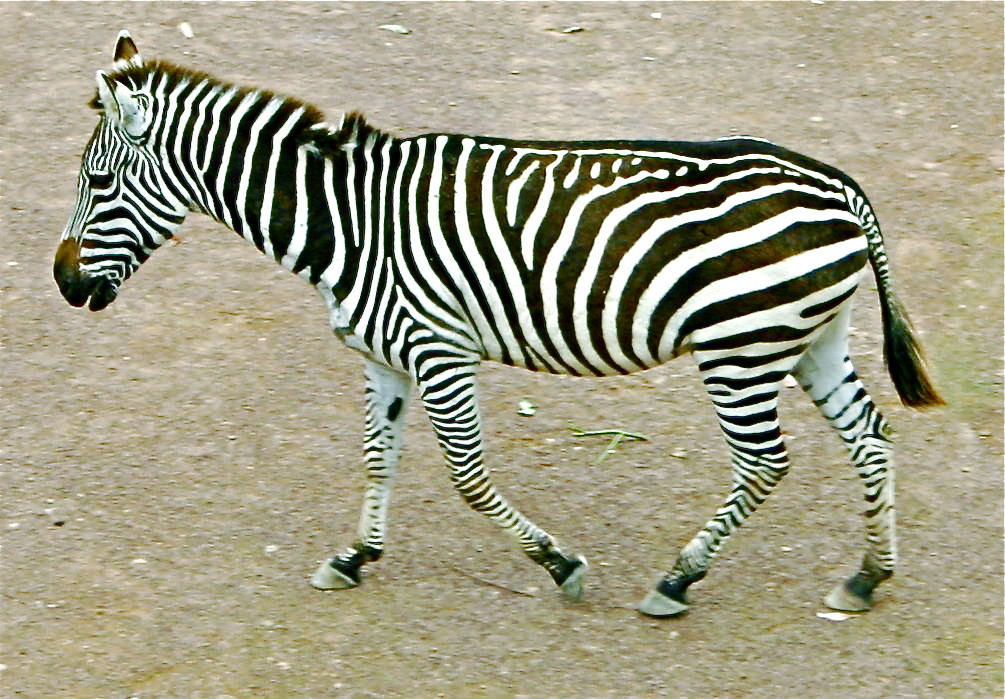
The zebra is a quadruped.

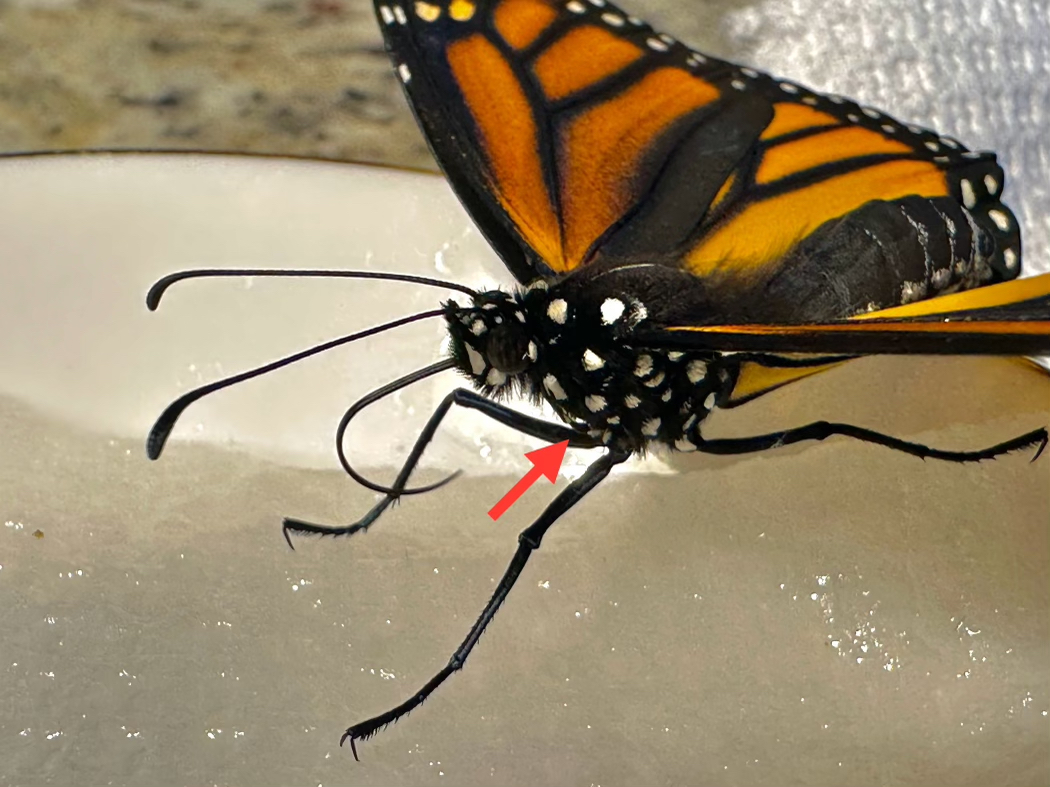
The monarch butterfly, while a quadruped, is not a tetrapod, but a hexapod. Arrow points to the miniature front leg not used for locomotion.

Quadrupedalism is a form of locomotion in which animals have four legs that are used to bear weight and move around. An animal or machine that usually maintains a four-legged posture and moves using all four legs is a quadruped (Latin quadru- 'four' and ped- 'foot'). Quadruped animals are found among both vertebrates and invertebrates.

== Quadrupeds vs. tetrapods ==
Although the words quadruped and tetrapod are both derived from terms meaning four-footed, they have distinct meanings. A tetrapod is any member of the taxonomic unit Tetrapoda (which is defined by descent from a specific four-limbed ancestor), whereas a quadruped actually uses four limbs for locomotion. Not all tetrapods are quadrupeds and not all quadrupedal animals are tetrapods; some arthropods are adapted for four-footed locomotion, such as the raptorial Mantodea, or mantises, and the Nymphalidae, or brush-footed butterflies—the largest butterfly family, with ~6000 species, including the well-known monarch (see photo).

The distinction between quadrupeds and tetrapods is important in evolutionary biology, particularly in the context of tetrapods whose limbs have adapted to other roles (e.g., arms and hands in the case of humans, wings in the case of birds and bats, and fins in the case of whales). All of these animals are tetrapods, but not all are quadrupeds. Even snakes, whose limbs have become vestigial or lost entirely, are, nevertheless, tetrapods.

== In infants and for exercise ==
Quadrupedalism is sometimes referred to as being "on all fours", and is observed in crawling, especially by infants.

In the 20th century quadrupedal movement was popularized as a form of physical exercise by Georges Hebert. Kenichi Ito is a Japanese man famous for speed running on four limbs in competitions.

== Other human quadrupedalism ==
Quadrupedalism in an Iraqi family

In July 2005, in rural Turkey, scientists discovered five Turkish siblings who habitually walked on both their hands and feet. Unlike chimpanzees, which ambulate on their knuckles, the Ulas family walked on their palms, allowing them to preserve the dexterity of their fingers.

== Quadrupedal robots ==
BigDog is a dynamically stable quadruped robot created in 2005 by Boston Dynamics with Foster-Miller, the NASA Jet Propulsion Laboratory, and the Harvard University Concord Field Station. Its successor was Spot.

Also by NASA JPL, in collaboration with University of California, Santa Barbara Robotics Lab, is RoboSimian, with emphasis on stability and deliberation. It has been demonstrated at the DARPA Robotics Challenge.

== Pronograde posture ==
A related concept to quadrupedalism is pronogrady, or having a horizontal posture of the trunk. Although nearly all quadrupedal animals are pronograde, bipedal animals also have that posture, including many living birds and extinct dinosaurs.

Nonhuman apes with orthograde (vertical) backs may walk quadrupedally in what is called knuckle-walking.
