= Upright posture =

The different orientation of the neuraxis between an upright biped (human) and a quadruped (dog)

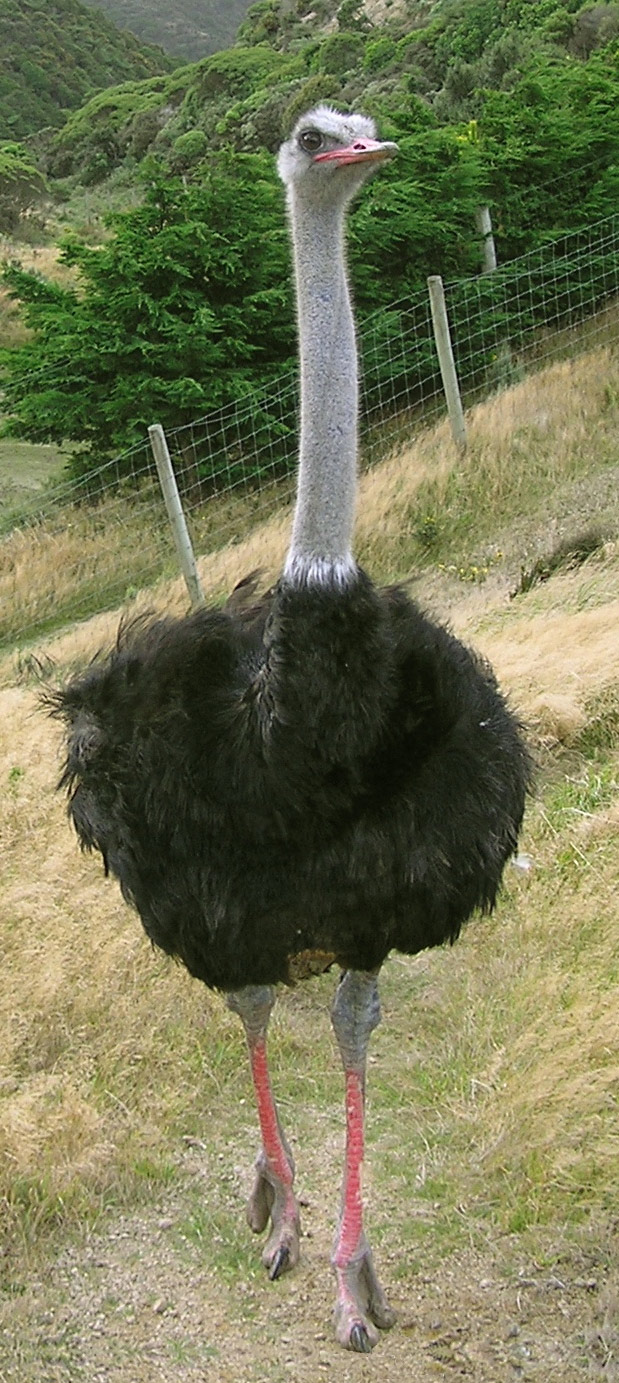
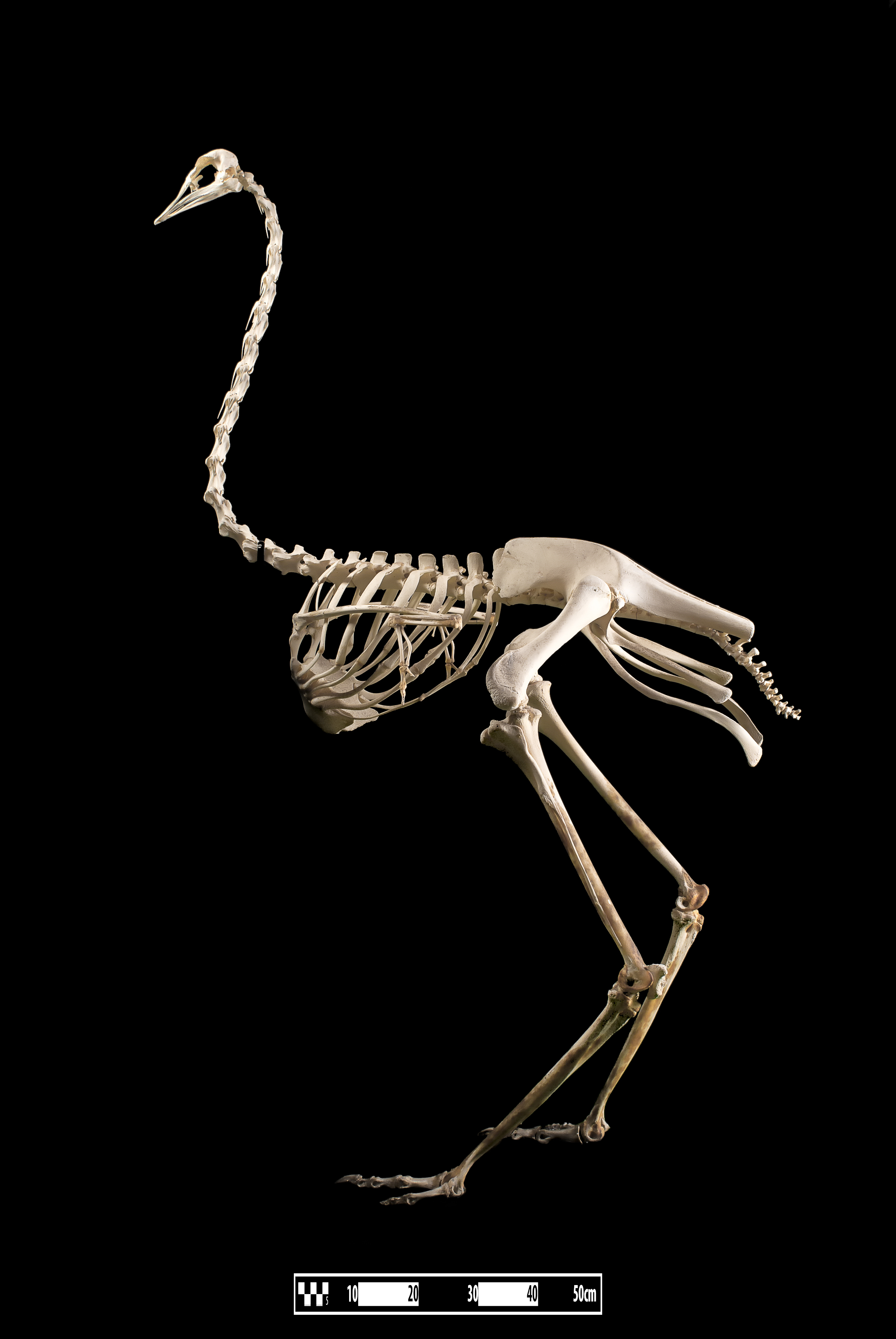
The seemingly upright bipedalism of a common ostrich (Struthio camelus) is in fact not a true upright posture

An upright posture or erect posture is the state of an animal's body where its craniocaudal axis is perpendicular (vertical) to the ground and to the direction it is facing/moving. Examples of such postures include some tetrapods with bipedal gait and the swimming posture of seahorses.

== Bipedal tetrapods ==
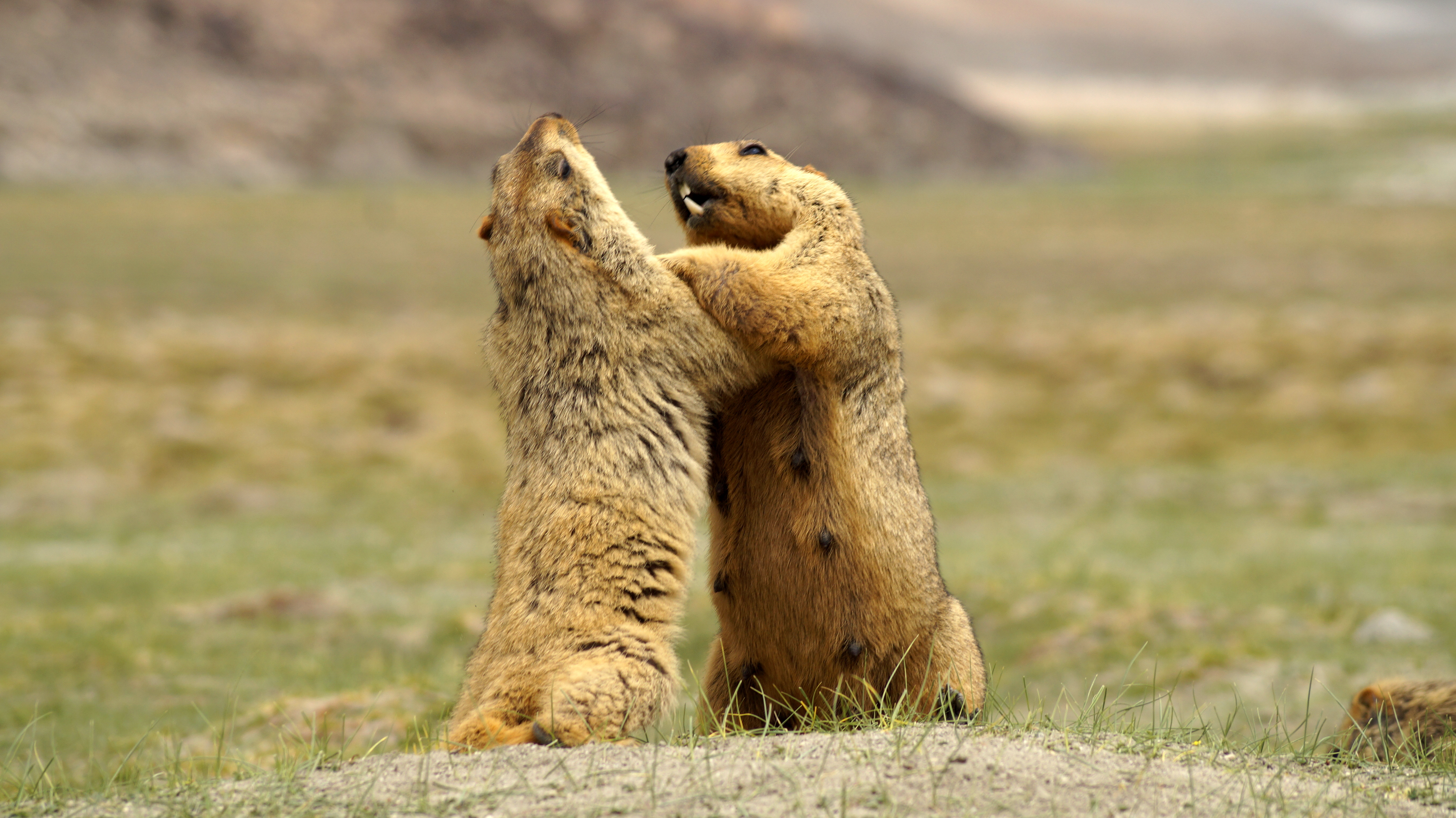
Two marmots fighting upright

Although bipedal tetrapods such as apes (hominids and gibbons), birds, macropods (kangaroos, wallabies, pademelons and quokkas), springhares and even the frilled lizard are all capable of (at least temporarily) weight-bearing and moving around using only hindlimbs (lower limbs), only the apes (when on the ground) and kangaroos (who routinely use their stiff tail as a "third leg" to support the body) are capable of a true upright posture with the spinal column axis vertical to the ground, the ventral surface of the torso (chest and abdomen) facing frontwards and the head directly above the feet. Other bipedal animals such as birds, kangaroo rats and mice and hopping mice actually have a "bowing" posture with the torso facing directly or obliquely downwards, and their "upright" appearance is largely due to the lower neck being flexed dorsally, which makes the head and upper neck upright but forward of the feet, and their craniocaudal axis resembling an exponential function (or "hockey stick") line rather than a vertical line.

Some quadruped animals, such as bears, meerkats and ground squirrels, can also temporarily assume an upright posture on their hindlimbs (typically aided by their tail), often to stay sentry against predators, or as a ritualistic dominance display for territoriality or to compete for mates.

Maintaining an upright posture requires anatomical and biomechanical adaptations that can compensate for not only the burden of weight upon the hindlimbs, but also the added challenge of balance because the line of weight now needs to be maintained between only two supporting columns instead of four, thus a much smaller base area of support. Examples of such adaptations include significant strengthening of the lower appendicular skeleton and musculature, evolutionary changes of the hip joint and femoral neck, lengthening of the digits (in digitigrades) and/or metatarsals (in plantigrades), and recruitment of the tail as an additional tripodic support (e.g. kangaroos). In contrast, pseudo-upright bipeds (e.g. birds and tetanuran dinosaurs) tend to use the tail and synsacrum as a counterweight against the head and thorax, which are usually front of their feet.

=== Humans ===
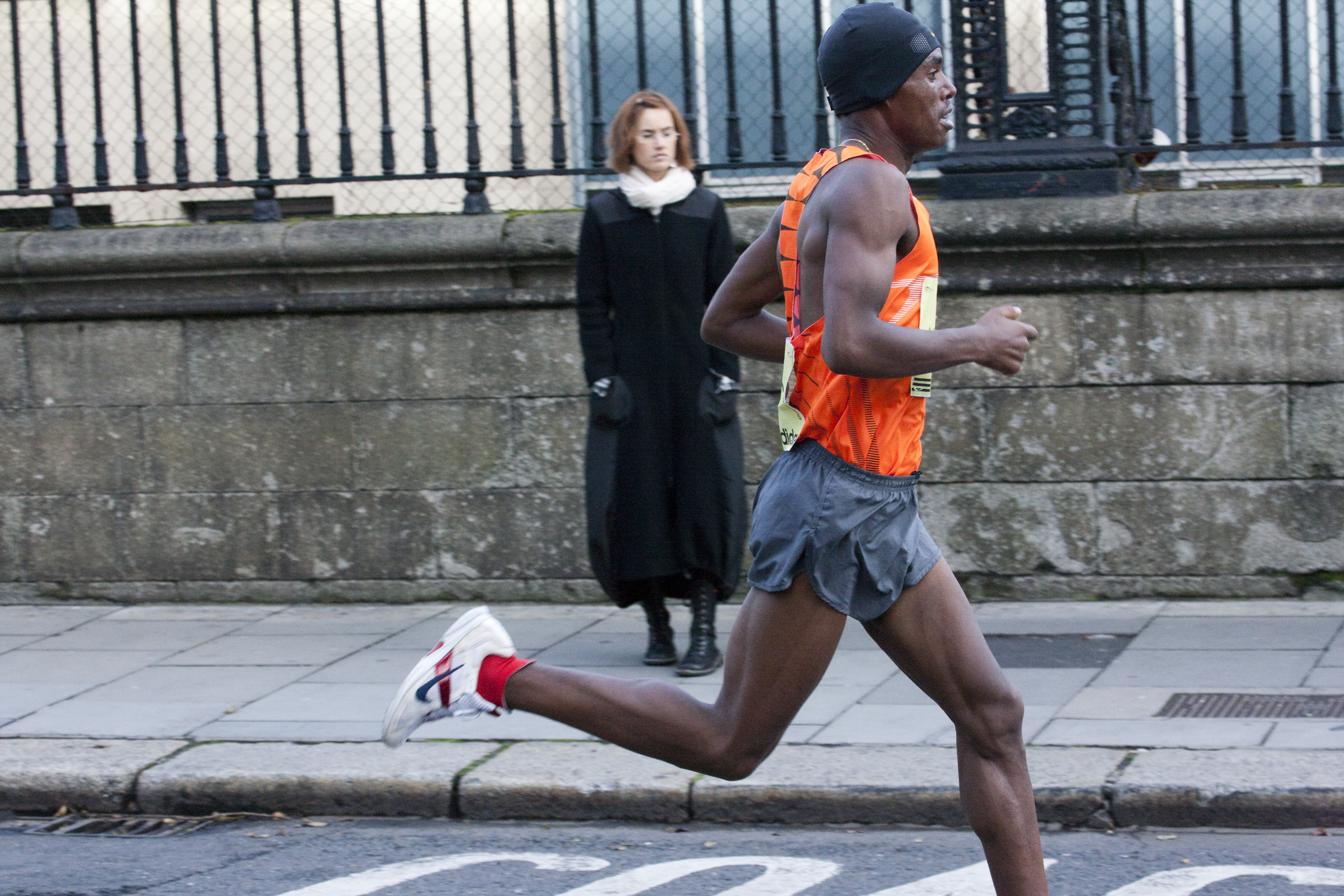
Two humans displaying true upright posture when running (front) and standing (back).

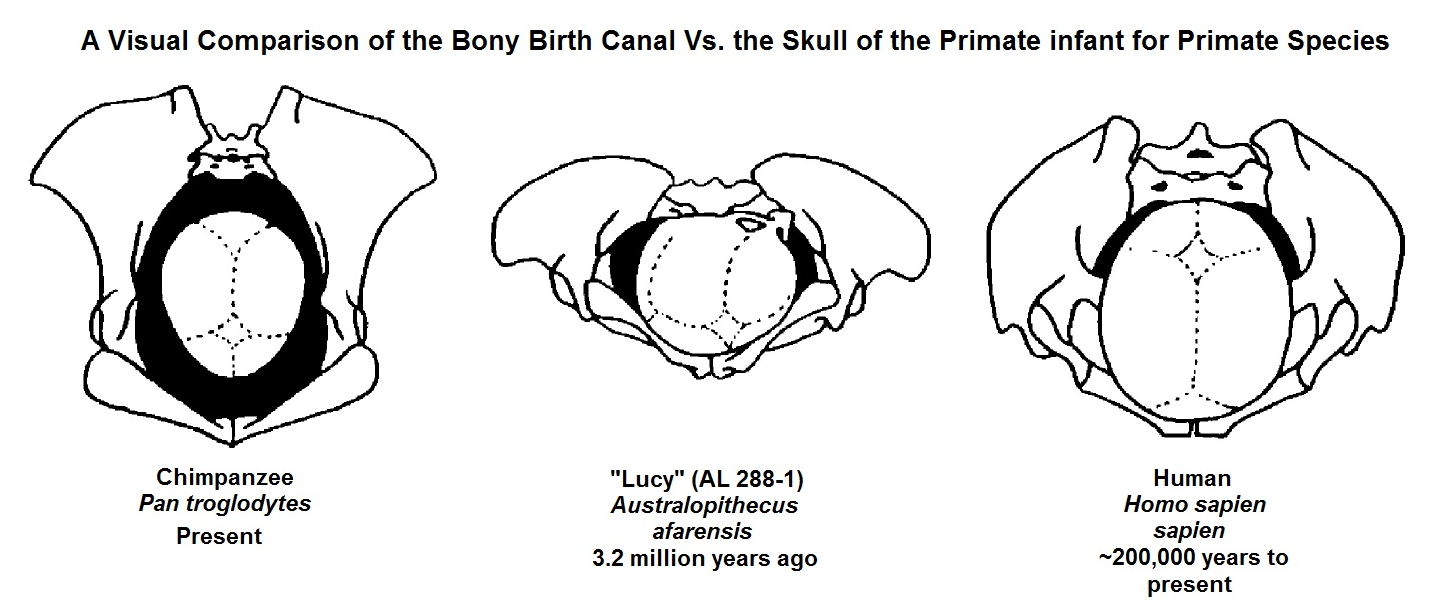
Comparison of the pelvis vs. infant skull among chimpanzee, "Lucy" and modern human.

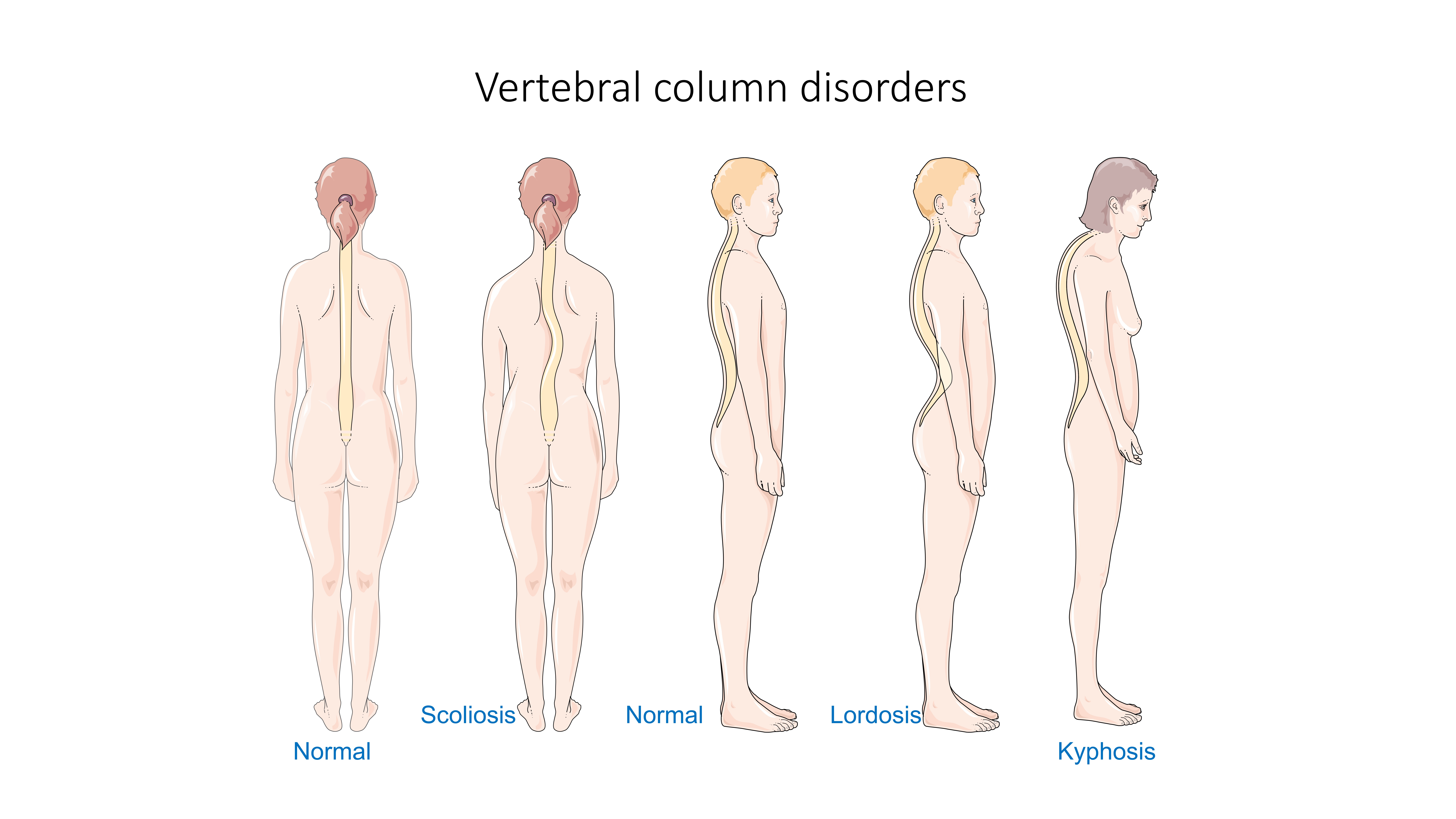
Human vertebral disorders

Humans, a genus of hominids (great apes) with only one extant species, are the only clade with an obligately upright posture, of which the forelimbs (upper limbs) rarely (if ever) partake in weight-bearing and locomotion. Other hominids (chimpanzees, bonobos, gorillas and orangutans) rely at least partially on knuckle-walking when moving on the ground, while humans are bipedal full-time except some rare occasions that require prostration or crawling. The upright posture of humans completely frees up their upper limbs (especially the hands), allowing them to evolve into highly prehensile appendages capable of object manipulation, fine motor skills and complex tool-making.

With the need to persistently maintain a truly upright posture, humans have evolved more specialized adaptations, such as significantly strengthened legs (which are not only much stronger but also longer than the arms), enlarged knees with meniscus compartmentalization, elongated, arched and fat padded feet with proportionally shortened toes, and a shorter but wider and deeper pelvis with larger acetabula. Lower limb muscles such as the soleus are routinely recruited during ambulation as a skeletal muscle pump that compresses the deep veins (which are valved) to assist circulatory return against the vertical distance from the heart, which conversely also means an increased risk of deep vein thrombosis with prolonged period of sedentariness. There is also an increased risk of osteoarthritis due to the gradual wearing of articular cartilages in the hip, knee and ankle joints. The ankles, which bear all the body weight above the feet while still needing to provide a high degree of range of motion, are also particularly prone to spraining (especially in the weaker lateral ligaments) and fractures due to the amount of mechanical stress and shocks the joints are subjected to during vigorous movements.

Another complication of upright posture in humans is a dimensionally limited pelvic outlet due to shortening of the pelvic anteroposterior axis, which restricts the birth canal in females and leads to an increase risk of prolonged labour during childbirth, especially in those with variationally narrower pelvis. This, coupled with the significantly larger head-to-body ratio of human infants compared to other vertebrates, predisposes human fetuses to cephalopelvic disproportion and obstructed labour, which warrants the trained assistance from birth attendants and even surgical caesarean sections (which were almost always lethal for the mother before modern medicine developed) for a successful delivery, as both maternal and perinatal mortality are significantly higher in unassisted/solitary births. This complication has been hypothesized as an evolutionary trade-off known as the obstetrical dilemma.

Humans have also evolved a secondary lordotic curvature of the lumbar spine that shifts the upper body's center of mass more dorsally within the base of support formed between the two feet. The physiological curvatures of the human spine, aided by the flaval and longitudinal ligaments as well as various core muscles, also function kinematically like a spring that absorbs axial shock when running, jumping and lifting weights. However, the axial structural load that the upright posture exerts on the entire vertebral column still significantly increases the risk of progressive spondylopathy and discopathy as well as acute injuries such as disc herniation and vertebral compression/burst fractures in humans.

== Seahorses ==
A seahorse displaying its upright swimming posture

Unlike other fish, which swim in the direction of their craniocaudal axis, seahorses swim upright in the ventrodorsal direction, using the dorsal fin for propulsion and the pectoral fins for steering. This is quite unique among nektonic aquatic animals, as locomotions in the direction parallel to the cranialcaudal axis are the most streamlined and thus hydrodynamically efficient, and such unusual swimming posture makes seahorses rather poor swimmers, with the dwarf seahorse (Hippocampus zosterae) being the slowest-moving fish in the world.

Seahorses have prehensile tails that lack caudal fins, which are practically useless for propulsion. Their tails are instead used to grasp onto seaweed, coral or any object that can anchor them against sea currents. Once anchored, the seahorses hold themselves up into the current like a hydra to passively ambush any food (typically small planktonic crustaceans such as mysids and copepods) that floats or swims nearby, which they suck in with their long snout using pivot feeding.

== Gallery ==
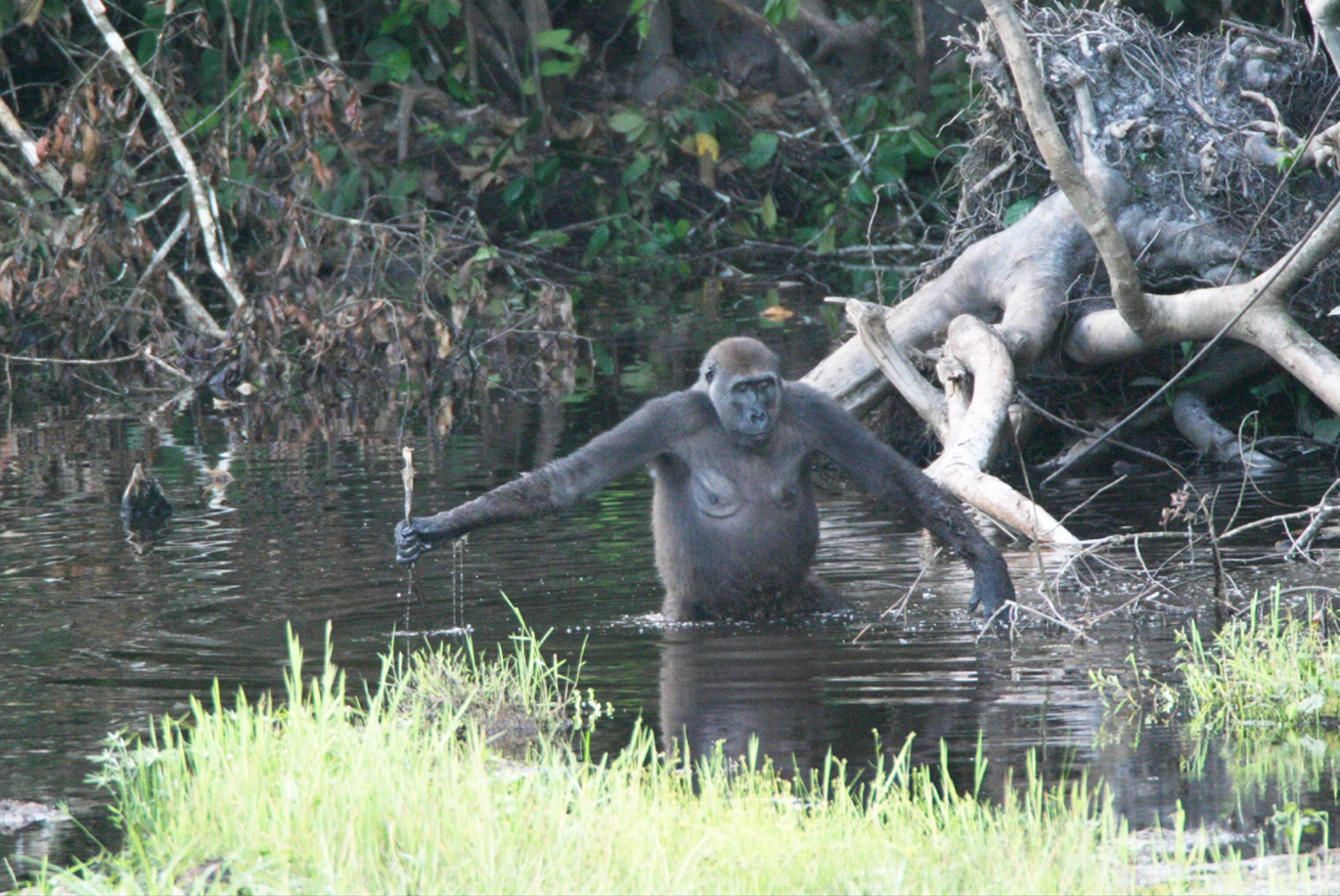
A western lowland gorilla walking upright through water, using a branch as a walking stick

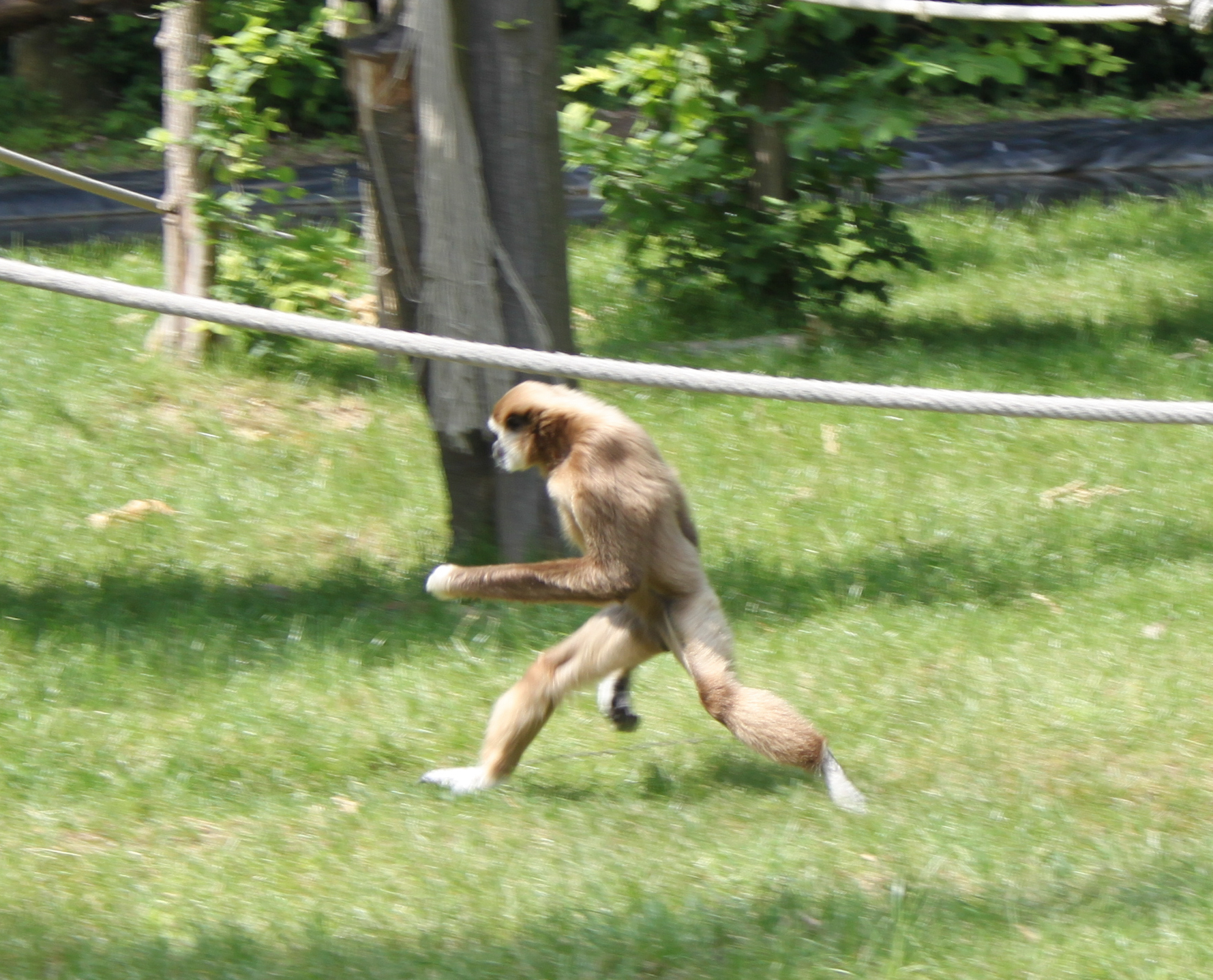
A lar gibbon running upright on ground

An Alaska Peninsula brown bear standing upright

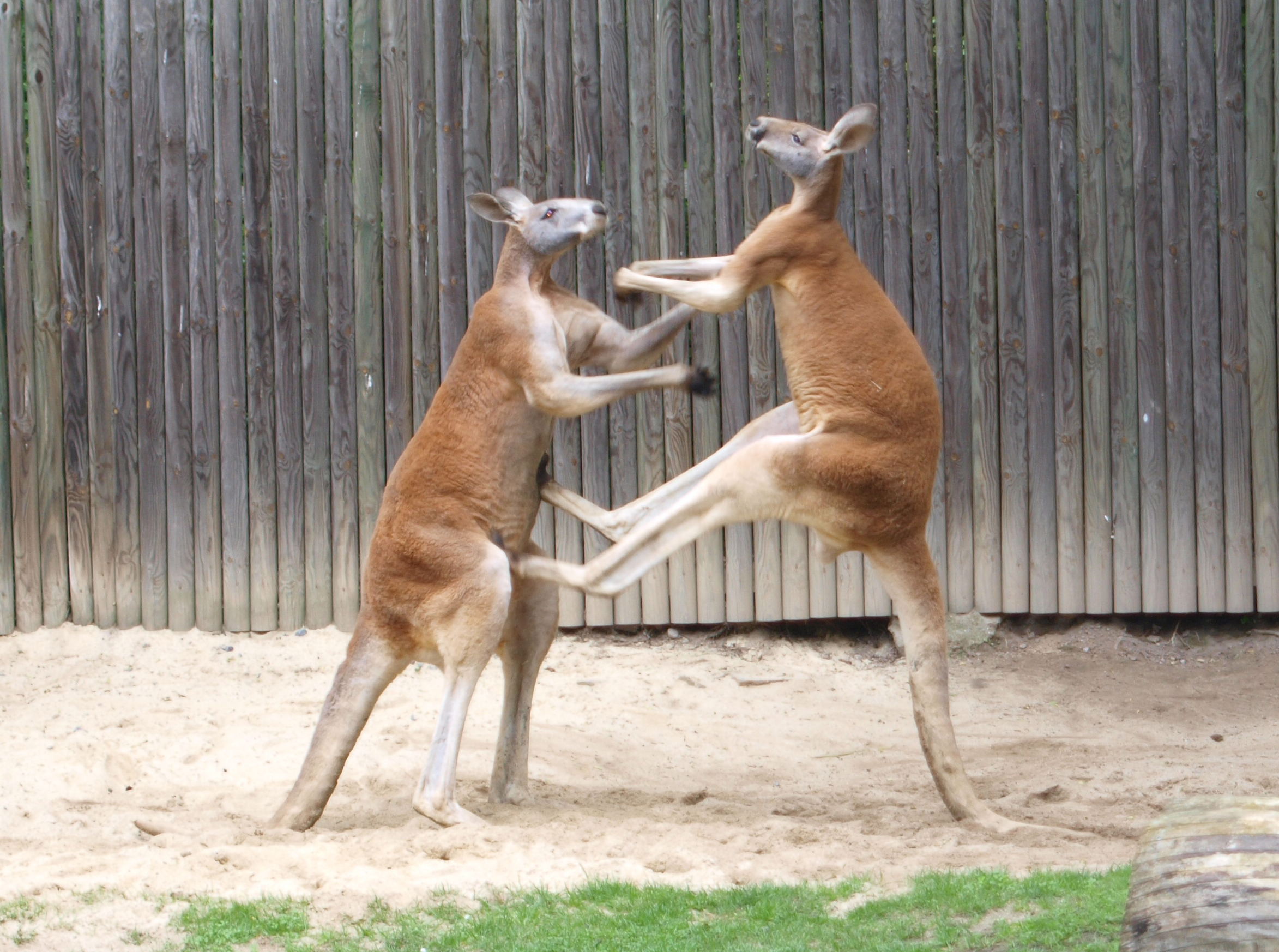
Two red kangaroos fighting upright, with their tails as additional support

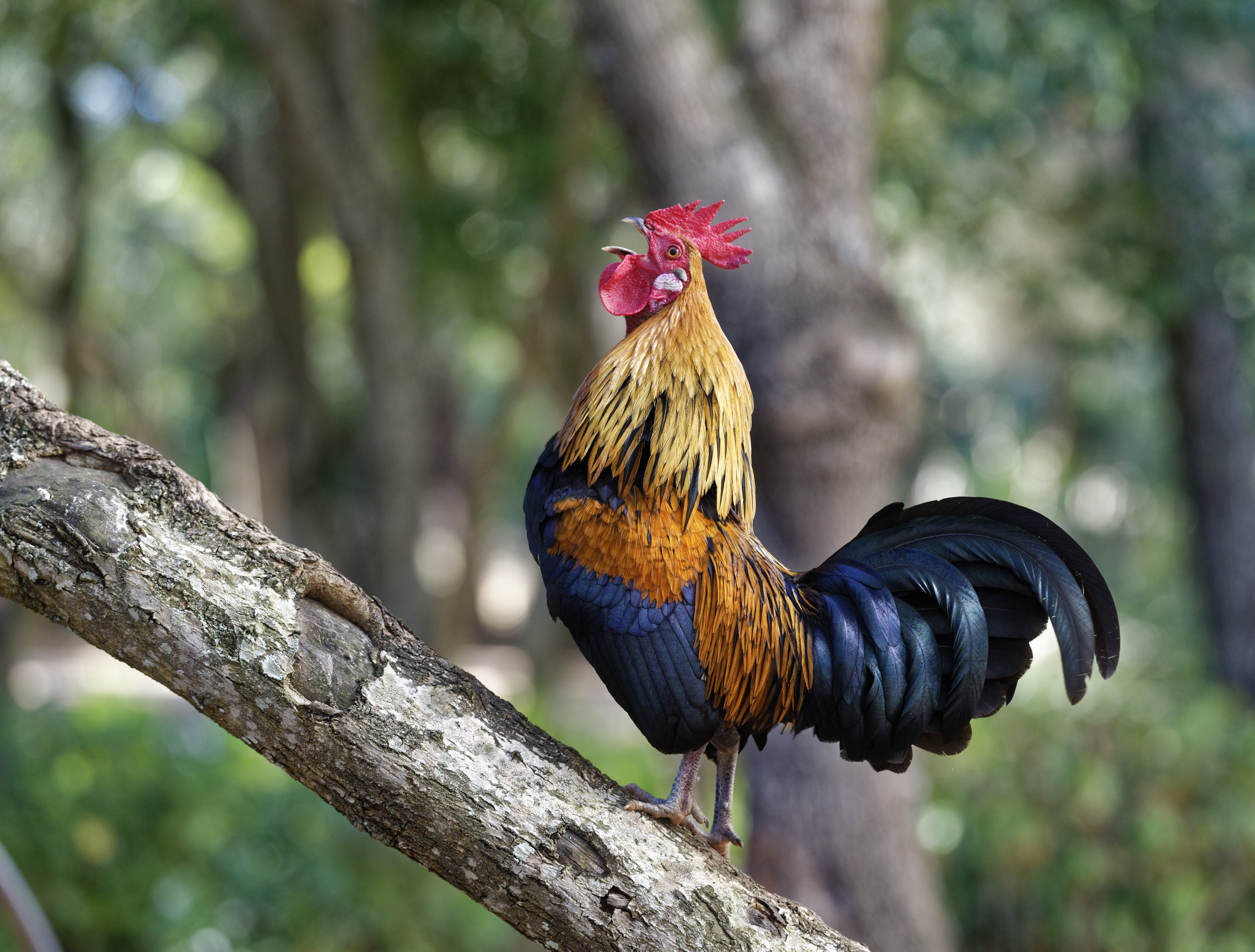
A red junglefowl standing on a tree with a near-upright posture

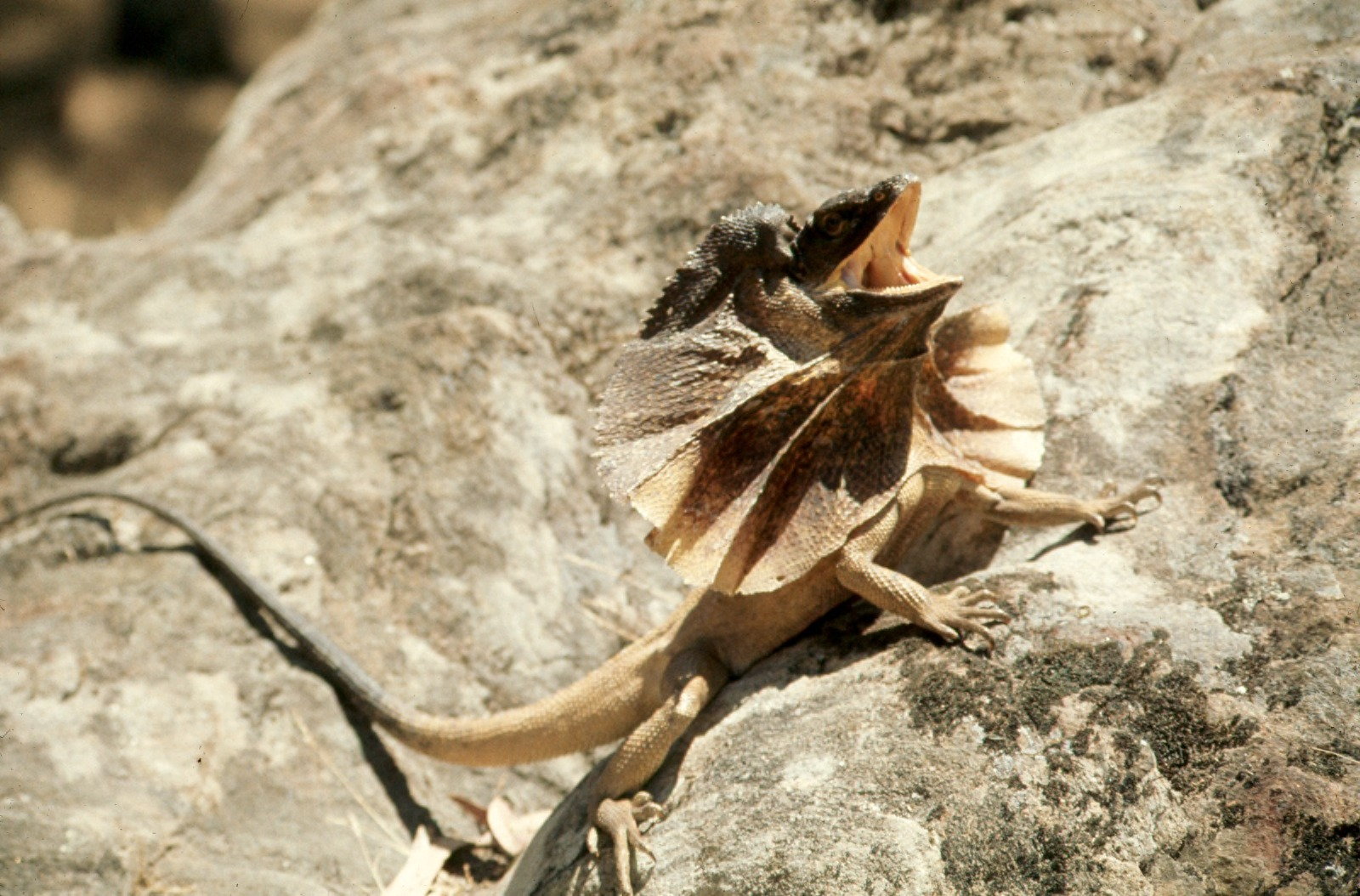
The frill-necked lizard is known to run near-upright on its hindlimbs to escape predators

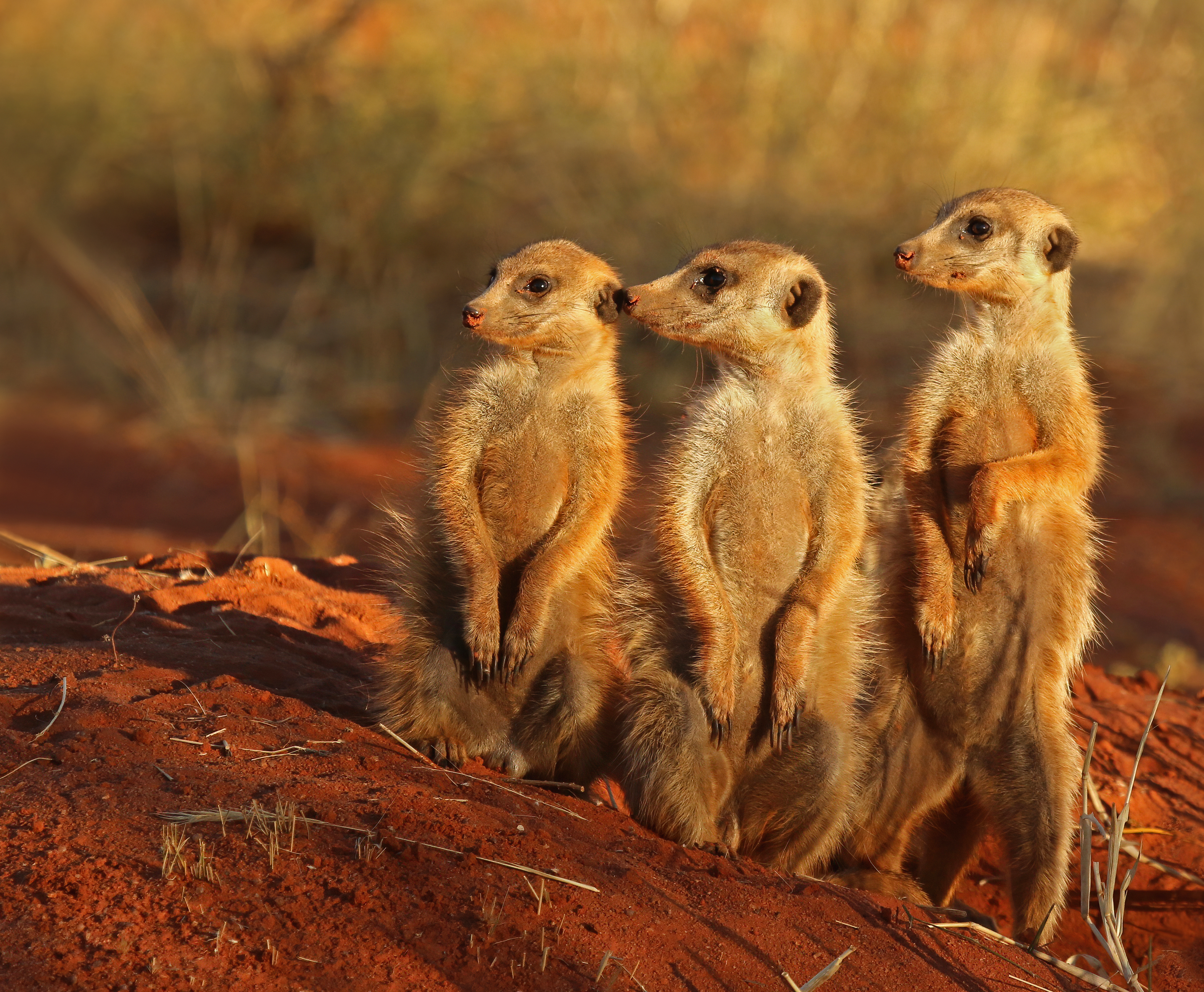
Meerkats often stand upright to spot for potential predators

== See also ==
- Orthograde posture, an upright walking posture
- Bipedalism
- Handstand, an inverted erect posture using only the upper limbs for weight-bearing
- Headstand, an inverted erect posture using the vertex of the head for weight-bearing
- Prone position
- Razorfish, a fish known for swimming in an inverted vertical posture
