= Toe walking =

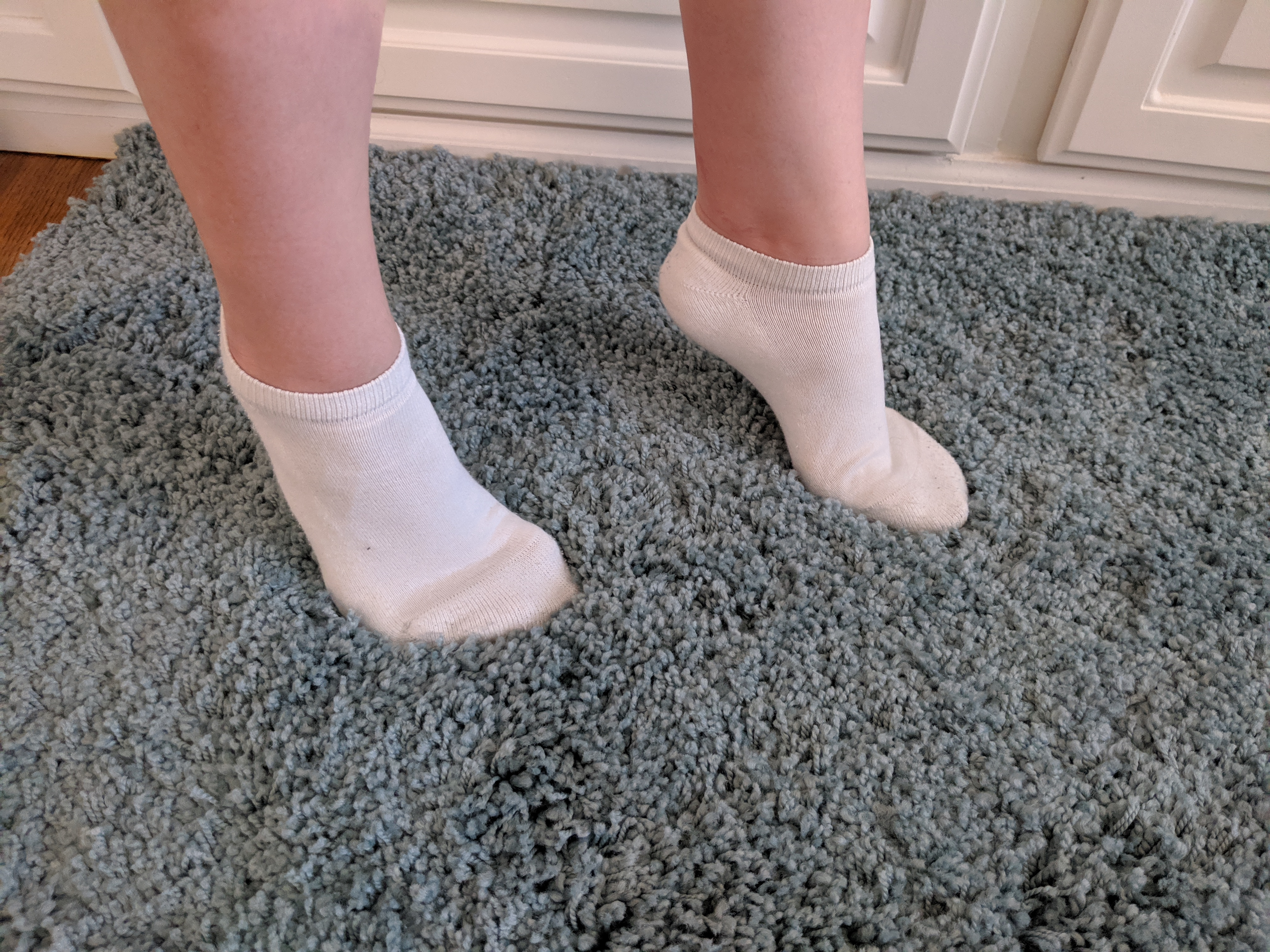
- Toe walking
- Specialty: Pediatrics, orthopedics
- Causes: short Achilles tendon, cerebral palsy, Duchenne muscular dystrophy, autism
- Treatment: Orthoses, Botox therapy
- Frequency: 5% of healthy 5-year-old children

Toe walking is a type of walking gait in which an individual walks tiptoed — bearing the load completely on their toes or the ball of their feet, without the heels contacting the ground. It is a common gait among cursorial terrestrial animals, where it is called unguligrade (walking on hoofed tips of the distal phalanges, e.g. in ungulates) or digitigrade (walking on digits and metatarsal heads, e.g. in birds, canines, felids, leporids and most rodents).

In humans, the standard gait when standing and walking is an upright (orthograde) one with the heel firmly contacting the ground and primarily responsible for weight-bearing — i.e. a plantigrade gait, although tiptoeing can be occasionally seen when running and jumping to utilize the arches of the foot for better kinematics and elastic shock damping, or when dancing where quick turns and ethereal presentations are required. Toe walking is, however, common in toddlers leaning to walk, and children who toe-walk as toddlers typically transition to a heel-toe walking pattern as they grow older. If a child continues to toe-walk past the age of three, or cannot get heels to the ground at all, medical authorities recommend examination by a health professional who is experienced in assessing children's walking.

Toe walking can be associated with a number of health conditions, or have an unknown reason. When no medical reason for toe walking and no underlying condition can be identified, health professionals will commonly refer to it as idiopathic toe walking, indicating that there is no identifiable reason or cause for the toe walking at that time. The child may have a diagnosis that becomes more apparent as they grow or never have a diagnosis that causes the toe walking. Idiopathic toe walking should only be considered after all other conditions have been excluded. Possible causes for toe walking include a congenital short Achilles tendon, muscle spasticity (commonly associated with cerebral palsy) or genetic diseases muscle disease such as Duchenne muscular dystrophy. Toe walking may also be caused by a bone block located at the ankle which prevents the ankle from moving. This may be the result of trauma or arthritis. Toe walking may also be one way of accommodating a separate condition, like foot drop. Persistent toe walking in children is also associated with developmental disabilities, such as autism. In a recent study, 68% of children with autism spectrum disorder report experiencing walking changes.

It is estimated that 5% of healthy 5-year old children toe-walk for no apparent reason (idiopathic toe walking). Idiopathic toe walking has also been observed more in males than females when very large groups of children with toe walking are observed. One study looked for a family history of toe walking, and found a connection with family members all toe walking with no medical reason (idiopathic toe walking). This may suggest a genetic link to idiopathic toe walking. Idiopathic toe walking spontaneously disappears over the years in the majority of cases and is most often not associated with a motor or cognitive issue.

== Cause ==
Idiopathic toe walking is always bilateral and has no orthopedic or neurological cause. Typically, it is diagnosed if it continues past the age of three. In this condition, children are able to voluntarily walk with the typical heel-toe pattern, but prefer to walk on their tip toes. In order for it to be considered idiopathic, the child's medical history must be clear of any neurological, orthopedic, or neuro-psychiatric conditions, including other gait abnormalities. It is thought to be related to sensory processing challenges. Two classifications of idiopathic toe walking have been established. The Alvarez's classification identifies the severity of the toe walking based upon kinematics and ankle rockers. The Pomarino classification identifies the toe walking according to the individual's specific characteristics and characterizes them into three types based on the signs presented.

=== Cerebral palsy ===
Studies have been performed to determine the source of the association between toe walking and cerebral palsy. One study suggests that the toe walking (sometimes called an equinus gait) associated with cerebral palsy presents with an abnormally short medial and lateral gastrocnemius and soleus—the primary muscles involved in plantarflexion. A separate study found that the gait could be a compensatory movement due to weakened plantarflexion muscles. In people who have cerebral palsy and toe walk, there is greater plantarflexion force required for normal heel-to-toe walking than for toe walking. When typically developing children are tasked to perform different types of toe walking, their toe walking could not reduce the force to the levels that children who toe walking with cerebral palsy have when they walk. This suggests that toe walking associated with cerebral palsy may be due to abnormally weakened plantarflexion that can only manage toe walking.

=== GLUT1 deficiency syndrome ===
Toe walking after cerebrospinal fluid glucose levels decrease is the representative symptom of those with GLUT1 deficiency syndrome.

== Diagnosis ==
There are many health professionals who assess and treat toe walking. Family physicians, neurologists, orthopaedic surgeons, pediatricians, physical therapists, physiotherapists and podiatrists are all commonly consulted. Treatment will depend on the cause of the condition.

== Treatment ==
For idiopathic toe walking in young children, health professionals may prefer to watch and wait, as the child may "outgrow" the toe walking with time. There are limited treatments that demonstrate long-term walking change. Many treatments instead focus on any tightness in the calf muscles that can be associated with the toe walking. Common treatments for idiopathic toe walking can include:

- Wearing a brace, splint or type of orthoses either during the day, night, or both. The brace limits the ability of the child to walk on their toes and may stretch muscle and tendon at the back of the leg. One type of orthoses commonly used are an ankle-foot orthoses (AFO).
- Serial casting, where the leg is cast with the calf muscle stretched. The cast is changed weekly with progressive stretching. Sometimes, these casts are not be changed weekly and instead every 2–3 weeks.
- Botox therapy may be used to paralyze the calf muscles to reduce the opposite of the muscles to work harder. This may be used with serial casting or splinting; however, one small study has shown this has limited impact.
- If conservative (non-surgical) measures do not help with changing the walking or making the calf muscles longer and correcting the toe walking after about 12–24 months, surgical lengthening of the tendon is an option. The surgery is typically done under full anaesthesia but, if there are no issues, the child is released the same day. After the surgery, a below-the-knee walking cast is often worn for six weeks and then an AFO is worn to protect the tendon for several months.

For toe walking which results from other medical conditions, additional specialists may need to be consulted.
