= Tiptoe (disambiguation) =

Tiptoe (also tiptoes or tippy toes) is the body posture of standing on one's toes.

Tiptoe, tiptoes, or tippy toes may refer to:

== Arts and entertainment ==
=== Music ===
- "Tiptoe" (song) by Imagine Dragons, 2012
- "Tip Toe" (Jason Derulo song), 2017
- "Tip Toe" (Roddy Ricch song), 2019
- "Tiptoe Through the Tulips", a 1929 song known for its 1968 recording by Tiny Tim
- "Tiptoe", a 2003 song by Goldfrapp from Black Cherry
- "Tiptoe", a 2001 song by Joy and the Boy from Paradise
- "Tiptoe", a song by The Smile from their 2024 album Cutouts
- "Tippy Toe", a 2004 song by Utada from Exodus

=== Film and stage ===
- Tip-Toes, a 1925 musical by the Gershwins and others
- Tip Toes, a 1927 British silent film comedy-drama starring Dorothy Gish and Will Rogers
- Tiptoes, a 2002 film featuring Matthew McConaughey, Kate Beckinsale, Patricia Arquette, and Gary Oldman

=== Television ===
- Tip Toe (TV series), a 2026 TV series by Russell T Davies

== Places ==
- Tip Toe Falls (or Tiptoe Falls), a small waterfall in Portola Redwoods State Park, California, USA
- Tiptoe, Hampshire, a village in the New Forest National Park, Hampshire, England

== Other uses ==
- Tippy Toe (character), in Marvel Comics
- HMS Tiptoe (P332), a British Royal Navy submarine launched in 1944

== See also ==
- Toe walking, a condition or ailment where a person walks on his or her toes
- En pointe, meaning "on the tips of the toes" in classical ballet
- Digitigrade, an animal that naturally stands or walks on its toes (or digits)
- The Tale of Timmy Tiptoes, a children's book by Beatrix Potter
