= Appendicular skeleton =

Part of the skeletal system

- Human appendicular skeleton

Details

Identifiers
- Latin: skeleton appendiculare
- TA98: A02.0.00.010
- TA2: 359
- FMA: 71222

The appendicular skeleton is the portion of the vertebrate endoskeleton consisting of the bones, cartilages and ligaments that support the paired appendages (fins, flippers or limbs). In most terrestrial vertebrates (except snakes, legless lizards, and caecillians), the appendicular skeleton and the associated skeletal muscles are the predominant weight-bearing and locomotive structures.

There are 126 bones in the human appendicular skeleton, including the skeletal elements within the shoulder and pelvic girdles, upper and lower limbs, and hands and feet. These bones have shared ancestry (are homologous) to those in the forelimbs and hindlimbs of all other tetrapods, which are in turn homologous to the pectoral and pelvic fins in fish.

== Etymology ==
The adjective "appendicular" comes from Latin appendicula, meaning "small addition". It is the diminutive of appendix, which comes from the prefix ad- (meaning "to") + and the word root pendere (meaning "to hang", from PIE root *(s)pen- meaning "to draw, stretch, spin").

== The organization of the appendicular system ==
Of the 206 bones in the human skeleton, the appendicular skeleton comprises 126. Functionally, it is involved in terrestrial locomotion and weight-bearing (lower limbs), and grasping and object manipulation (upper limbs).

The appendicular skeleton forms during development from cartilage, by the process of endochondral ossification.

The appendicular skeleton is divided into six major regions:

- Shoulder girdle (4 bones) – Left and right clavicle (×2) and scapula (×2).
- Arms and forearms (6 bones) – Left and right humerus (arm) (×2), ulna (×2) and radius (forearm) (×2).
- Hands and wrists (54 bones) – Left and right carpals (wrist) (×16), metacarpals (×10) (palm), proximal phalanges (×10), intermediate phalanges (×8) and distal phalanges (finger) (×10).
- Pelvis (2 bones) – left and right hip bones (×2), each of which is actually a fusion of three bones (ilium, ischium, and pubis).
- Thighs and legs (8 bones) – Left and right femur (thigh) (×2), patella (knee) (×2), tibia (×2), and fibula (leg) (×2).
- Feet and ankles (52 bones) – Left and right tarsals (ankle) (×14), metatarsals (foot) (×10), proximal phalanges (×10), intermediate phalanges (×8), and distal phalanges (toe) (×10).

Through anatomical variation, the appendicular skeleton may have an accessory bone. Examples include sesamoids in the hands and feet. Some occurrences are rarer than others.

The 126 bones of the appendicular skeleton and the 80 bones of the axial skeleton together form the complete skeleton of 206 bones in the human body. Unlike the axial skeleton, the appendicular skeleton is made up of significantly more long bones and predominantly articulated via synovial joints, which allow for a much greater range of motion.

== See also ==
- Axial skeleton
- Lepidotrichia, bony spines in ray-finned fish that are functional analogues of appendicular skeleton.
