= Thoracic limb =

A thoracic limb is a limb attached to the thorax. It may refer to one of these topics:

- Upper limb, in human anatomy
- Forelimb, in animal anatomy
- Arthropod limb, in insect anatomy

== See also ==
- Pelvic limb (disambiguation)
