= Limb (anatomy) =

Moved by muscles paired appendages, which consist of different members

A limb (from Old English lim, meaning "body part") is a jointed, muscled appendage of tetrapod vertebrate animals used for weight-bearing, terrestrial locomotion and physical interaction with other objects. The distalmost portion of a limb is known as its extremity. The limbs' bony endoskeleton, known as the appendicular skeleton, is homologous among all tetrapods, who use their limbs for walking, running and jumping, swimming, climbing, flying, grasping, touching and striking.

All tetrapods have four limbs that are organized into two bilaterally symmetrical pairs, with one pair at each end of the torso, which phylogenetically correspond to the four paired fins (pectoral and pelvic fins) of their fish (sarcopterygian) ancestors. The cranial pair (i.e. closer to the head) of limbs are known as the forelimbs or front legs, and the caudal pair (i.e. closer to the tail or coccyx) are the hindlimbs or back legs. In animals with a more erect bipedal posture (mainly birds and hominid primates, particularly humans), the forelimbs and hindlimbs are often called upper and lower limbs, respectively. The fore-/upper limbs are connected to the thoracic cage via the pectoral/shoulder girdles, and the hind-/lower limbs are connected to the pelvis via the hip joints. Many animals, especially the arboreal species, have prehensile forelimbs adapted for grasping and climbing, while some (mostly primates) can also use hindlimbs for grasping. Some animals (birds and bats) have expanded forelimbs (and sometimes hindlimbs as well) with specialized feathers or membranes to achieve lift and fly. Aquatic and semiaquatic tetrapods usually have limb features (such as webbings) adapted to better provide propulsion in water, while marine mammals and sea turtles have convergently evolved flattened, paddle-like limbs known as flippers.

In human anatomy, the upper and lower limbs are commonly known as the arms and legs respectively, although in academic usage, these terms refer specifically to the upper arm and lower leg (the lower arm and upper leg are instead called forearm and thigh, respectively). The human arms have relatively great ranges of motion and are highly adapted for grasping and for carrying objects. The extremity of each arm, known as the hand, consists of the palm and five opposable digits known as fingers, and specializes in intrinsic fine motor skills for precise manipulation of objects. The human legs and their extremities — the feet — are specialized for upright posture and bipedal locomotion. Compared to most other mammals that walk and run on all four limbs, human limbs are proportionally weaker but very mobile and versatile, and the unique dexterity of the human upper extremities allows them to make sophisticated tools and machines that compensate for the lack of physical strength and endurance.

== Anatomy ==
Limbs are attached to the torso via girdles, either the pectoral girdle for the forelimbs, or the pelvic girdle for the hindlimbs. In terrestrial tetrapods, the pectoral girdles are more mobile, floating over the rib cage connected only via the clavicles (to the sternum) and numerous muscles; while the pelvic girdles are typically fused together anteriorly via a fibrocartilaginous joint and posteriorly with the vertebral column (sacrum), forming an immobile ring-like pelvis. The girdles are each connected to the corresponding limb proper via a ball-and-socket synovial joint.

The overall patterns of forelimbs and hindlimbs are homologous among all tetrapods, as they all branched out of the same bottlenecked lineage of stegocephalians that survived the Late Devonian extinction. The body plan of tetrapod limbs are so similar (especially the pentadactyly) that they are given shared terminologies for each component of the appendicular skeleton.

- The proximal half of the limb proper has one long bone, the stylopodium (plural: stylopodia), which may be the humerus of the upper arm (proximal forelimbs), or the femur of the thigh (proximal hindlimbs).
- The distal half of the limb proper has two long bones, together termed the zeugopodium (plural: zeugopodia). These may be radius and ulna of the forearm, or the tibia and fibula of the shin.
- The distalmost portion or extremity of the limb, i.e. the hand or foot, is known as the autopodium (plural: autopodia). Hands are technically known as the manus, and feet as the pes.
  - The proximal part of the autopodium, i.e. the wrist or ankle region, has many small nodular bones, collectively termed the mesopodium (plural: mesopodia). Wrist bones are known as the carpals, and ankle bones are known as the tarsals.
  - The middle part of the autopodium is the metapodium (plural: metapodia), composed of the slender long bones each called a metapodial. The metapodials of the hand are known as metacarpals, while the metapodials of the foot are known as metatarsals. The ventral (or flexor) aspect of the hand is known as the palm or vola, and that of the foot as the sole or planta.
  - The distalmost part of the autopodium are the digits (fingers or toes), which have multi-jointed phalanges and are highly mobile in most tetrapods. The ends of the digits are often protectively covered by hardened keratin outgrowths such as claws and nails.

== Development ==
Limb development is controlled by Hox genes. All jawed vertebrates surveyed so far organize their developing limb buds in a similar way. Growth occurs from proximal to distal part of the limb. On the distal end, the differentiation of skeletal elements occurs in an apical ectodermal ridge (AER) which expands in rays. A Zone of Polarizing Activity (ZPA) at the rear part of the AER coordinates the differentiation of digits.

== See also ==
- Anatomical terms of location
- Anatomical terms of motion
- Ascending limb of loop of Henle
- Descending limb of loop of Henle
- Orthosis
- Phantom limb
