= Pelvic limb =

Pelvic limb may refer to:

- Lower limb, in human anatomy
- Hindlimb, in animal anatomy

== See also ==
- Thoracic limb (disambiguation)
