= Fall Creek (San Mateo County, California) =

River in San Mateo County, California, United States

Coordinates: 37°14′57″N 122°13′04″W

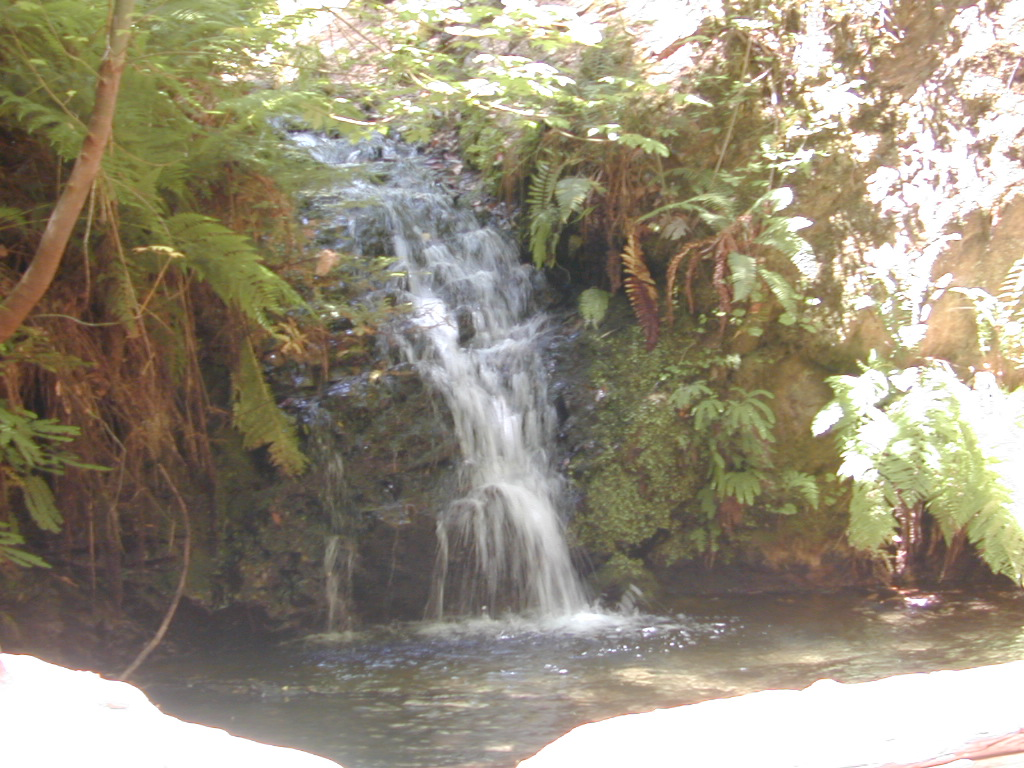
Tip Toe Falls on lower Fall Creek.

Fall Creek is a small river in the Santa Cruz Mountains, in San Mateo County, California, United States. It is a tributary of Pescadero Creek.

The creek flows through a Coast Redwood (Sequoia sempervirens) forest in its short course through a narrow canyon. It is a left-bank tributary of Pescadero Creek and is perennial, being fed by rain in the winter and by fog drip in the summer and fall.

Near its mouth, the creek plunges over Tip Toe Falls, a series of two waterfalls that has a total drop of 14 feet (4.2m).

== See also ==
- List of watercourses in the San Francisco Bay Area
