= Tiptoe =

Style of walking where the weight is put on the ball of the foot

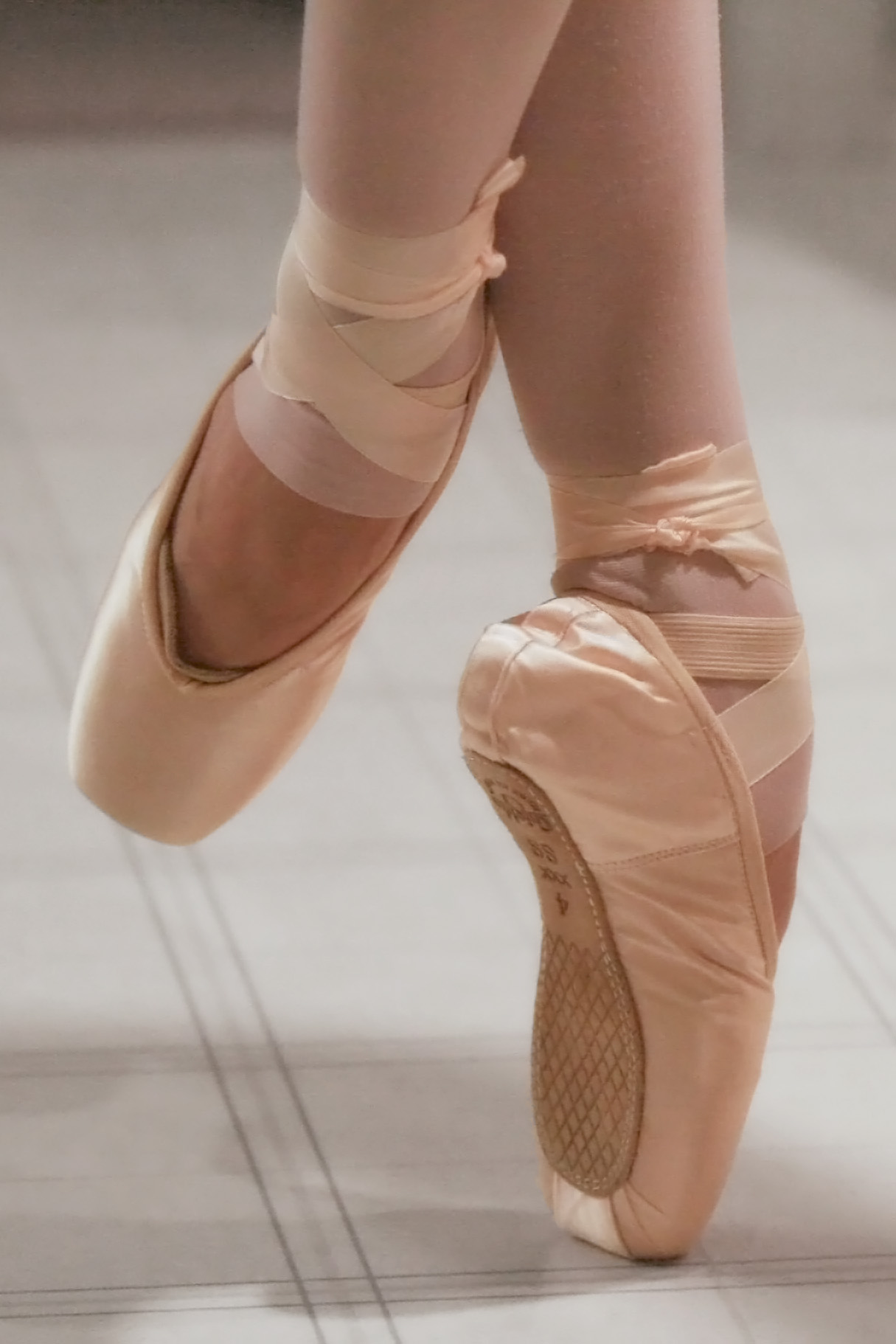
A ballet dancer standing en pointe

Tiptoe (tiptoes or tippy toes) describes the human body posture and locomotion that lift and keep the heel(s) of one or both feet off the ground, so the burden of weight-bearing is on the front portion of the feet. The term is mostly used colloquially when the weight is placed on the balls of the feet rather than literally on the tips of the toes; literal tip-toeing is difficult but possible, as in the pointe technique of ballet. In running, landing on the ball of the foot is known as forefoot strike.

== Kinesiology ==
To go into tiptoe, the ankle must be flexed to raise the heel off the ground. This requires the engagement of the calf muscle, along with various other muscles in the foot and shin to stabilize the joint. Even with this, the form is often less stable, requiring the engaging of muscles within the torso and a better sense of weight for the person to stay balanced. There is generally some movement, even subtle, in the ankle, as holding it statically would make balance difficult, so it is the first to give.

== Uses ==
=== Height ===
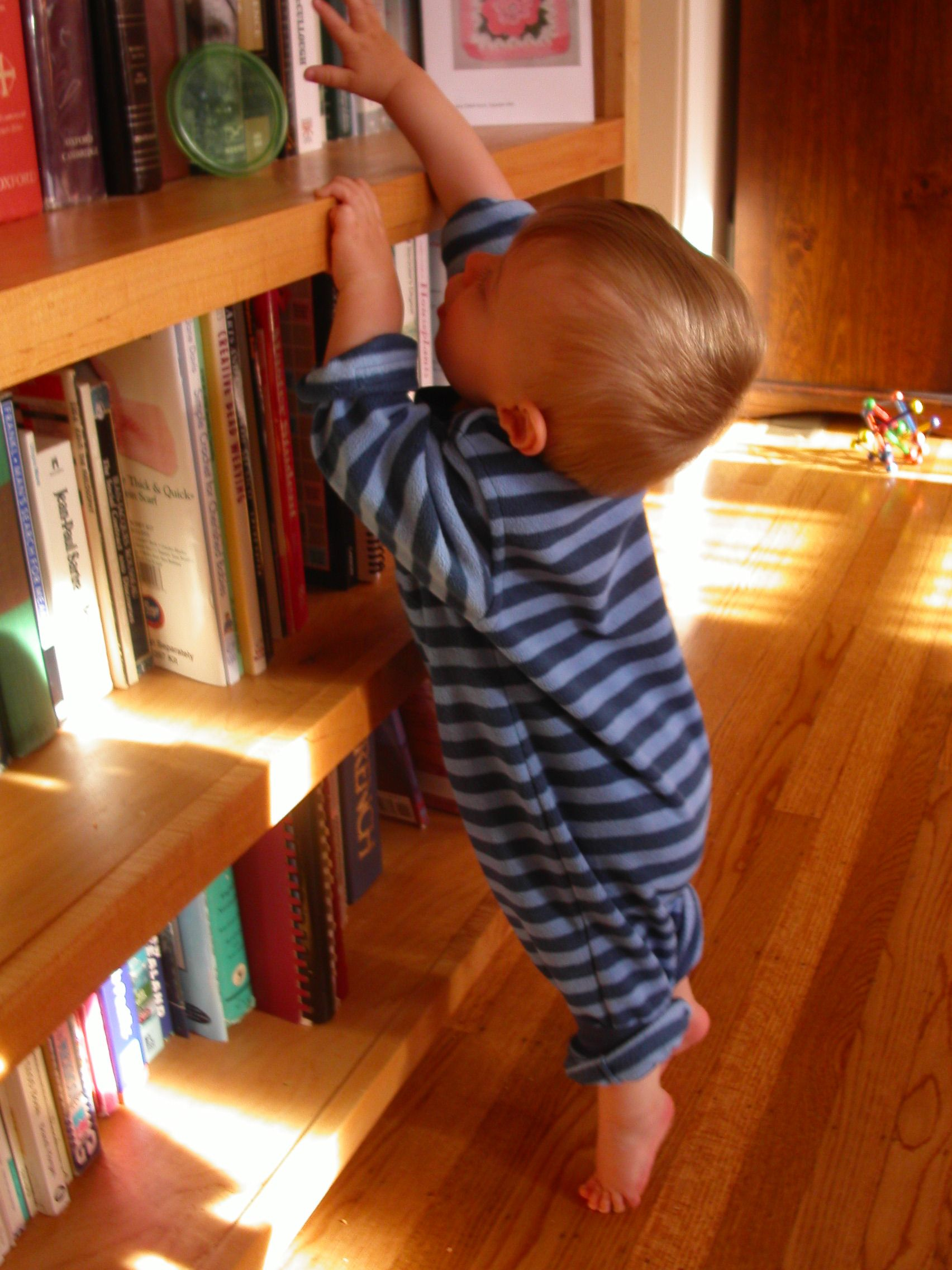
A baby stands on tiptoes to reach a book

Raising up on the toes will increase someone's height and reach. It is used often to make someone appear taller, whether in an engagement, or when measuring one's height. It is also used to reach objects that are higher up than one can reach when on one's heels.

=== Quietness ===
Walking only on the balls of the foot greatly reduces the surface area of the foot on the ground, allowing what does touch the ground to be more carefully placed, which is useful for avoiding twigs, and also for a more quiet walking. The disadvantage is that it will also focus the weight, which leaves greater indentations and exerts more pressure. This will commonly happen in walking, but can be slowly controlled, so it is more a factor for when wearing shoes in the dark (or when one has one's eyes or attention averted elsewhere), when obstructions cannot be felt with bare feet, or seen.

Prowling about on tiptoe is the stereotypical candor of a thief or spy, often accompanied by light tones sounding upon each of their steps.

=== Rotation ===
When rotating on either one leg or two, the body requires reducing friction. Raising to one leg is often one source of doing this, although since it doubles the weight on the other leg, it is not effective, so is mainly done when the other leg is used to torque to increase a spin, or very quickly so that the mass is more in the air, and has not settled on the other foot.

While it is often stated that decreasing the surface area of a foot decreases friction, this is untrue, as friction is independent of surface area. However, reducing the area does decrease the torque that the friction produces, thus making rotation easier. This is done by either going on the heel of the foot, ball of the foot, or sometimes, the toe/toes of the feet (often only possible by very light people, such as Rose in Titanic, or those with ballet shoes for en pointe known as pointe shoes).

Another effect is that the weight of the body is centered above the point of contact, so that the center of gravity occurs on the axis of rotation. This allows a faster spin with far less force placed upon the stabilizers. Bringing in the limbs (much like on a spinning swing) also accelerates this.

With two legs, the centre of gravity would still occur on the axis of rotation, and be centred directly between the two points of contact.

This is utilized in dance (namely ballet, with Relevé, Elevé/rise, and ), martial arts, footbag, and anything else that requires dynamic twists, changes in direction, and spins.

The friction of rotation is still considerable, however, and tends to wear, toughen, and polish the area of the foot being rotated upon. As a comparison, in breakdancing, those who perform headspins often go bald. The foot is more tailored to absorbing and benefitting from such rotations, although perhaps not so much on hard level surfaces, as our natural environment usually is uneven and has some give. This is why it is easier and safer to do by implementing one of two factors:

- Reducing friction by doing it on a polished slippery floor, or ice, or wearing footwear which has less friction or is more able to absorb it, such as a sock, ballet shoe, or skate.
- Increasing give (and possibly friction) but spreading the force to a larger area of the foot by having give, mostly in the surface (such as gym or karate mats).

Rotating on the ball of the foot is normally preferred due to the normal advantage of tiptoe, and the springiness of the body, which is why many martial arts encourage sparring opponents to stay on tip toe the entire match, for better movement as well as rotation. As there are actually two surfaces to the ball of the foot, and toes to grip, it also allows better control.

In theory, however, rotation on the ball of the foot is much faster. The main problem is the danger of either falling backwards or of not keeping up the pose, falling back on the balls of the foot. Twists done on the heel of the foot are often quick twists, done leaning backwards while bringing the foot upwards in an arc, so that it is more of a controlled fall that the other foot can come out and stabilize.

== Literal ==
While it is possible to literally tip-toe, it does not seem biomechanically viable. While strong enough to temporarily support bodyweight, toes would not likely be able to accommodate the rotational forces (especially while keeping rigid, and balanced) involved in spinning. As the big toe is prominent, literal tip toe would involve raising up on the big toe, otherwise the legs would require outward rotation to make other toes touch, rotating out mostly at the hips and risking injury in the knees if not done properly.

It is an impressive stunt, much akin to finger-tip push ups, although not as visually obvious, making it difficult to evaluate, as toes are shorter and wider, making the difference between the tips and pads of the toes (as in fingers) far more difficult to discern.

== In popular culture ==
- Tip-Toes, a 1925 musical by the Gershwins
- Tip Toes, a 1927 British silent film
- Tiptoes, a 2003 film
- "Tippy Toe", a 2004 song from Exodus by Hikaru Utada
- "Tiptoe", a 2004 song from Paradise by Joy and the Boy
- "Tiptoe", a 2012 song by Imagine Dragons
- “Tip Toe Wing in My Jawwdinz”, a 2014 song by RiFF RAFF
- The Tale of Timmy Tiptoes, the title character and children's book by Beatrix Potter

== See also ==
- High-heeled shoe
- Digitigrade and unguligrade
- Tiptoe Through the Tulips
