= Tip Toe Falls =

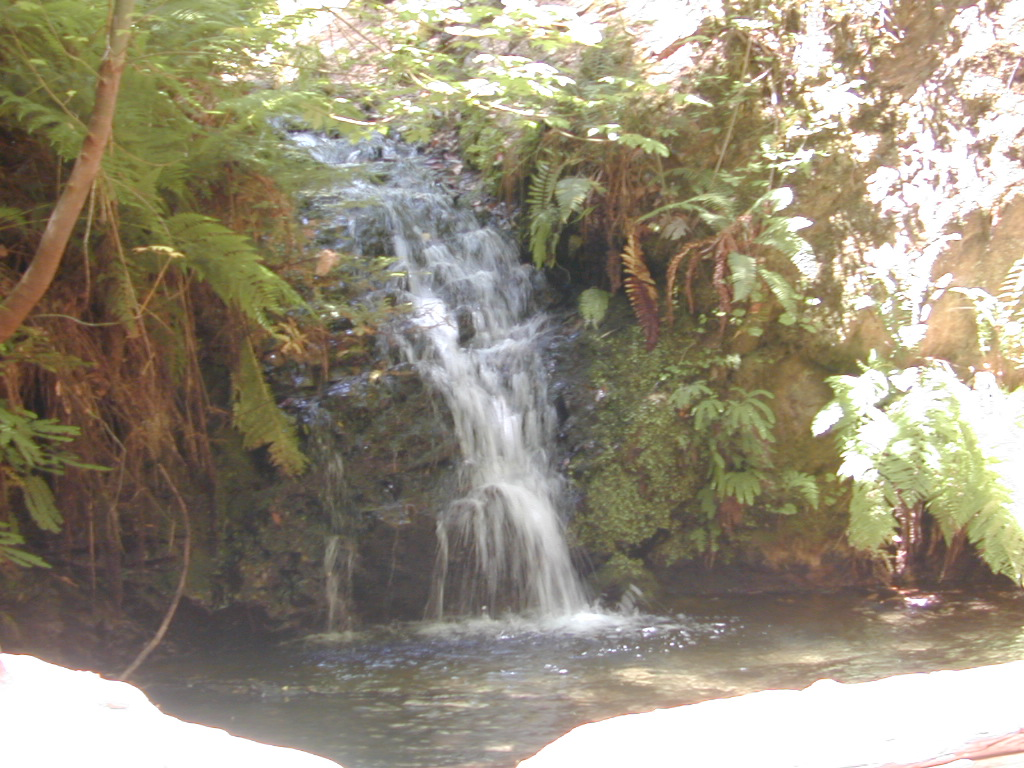
- Tip Toe Falls viewed from the edge of its pool.

- Location within California
- Location: Portola Redwoods State Park, San Mateo County, California, United States
- Coordinates: 37°14′53″N 122°13′13″W
- Type: Cascade
- Total height: 14 feet (4.3 m)
- Number of drops: 1
- Longest drop: 8 feet (2.4 m)
- Total width: 2 feet (0.61 m)
- Average width: 1 foot (0.30 m)
- Watercourse: Fall Creek

Tip Toe Falls (also known informally as Tiptoe Falls), is a 6-foot (1.8 m) tall waterfall (though commonly mismeasured from 5 to 8 feet (1.5 to 2.4 m)) on Fall Creek in the Portola Redwoods State Park, California. There is also an 8-foot (2.4 m) upper falls, a few hundred feet upstream, which is much lesser known.

The falls, fed by Fall Creek (a tributary of Pescadero Creek) starts by cascading down a mossy, 8 foot (2.4m) upper tier into a small pool. The creek continues downstream between grassy banks, and before long, falls over the more well known, 6 foot (1.8 m) lower tier. The lower tier empties into a round pool approximately 6” deep, before the creek cascades over sticks and rocks and continues its way downstream.

== Description ==
Tip Toe Falls is located in a redwood forest, on a short and steep tributary of Pescadero Creek. Its two tiers tumble over 8 and 6 feet (2.4 and 1.8 m) into shallow pools. The upper tier cascades out of dense undergrowth and forest, down a mossy cliff wall into a small and shallow pool. Near the bottom, the upper falls splits into two around a fallen log. Between the upper falls and the main falls, the creek winds through a small, fern-bounded meadow at the bottom of a steep ravine with mossy rock walls that rise over 50 feet (15m) above the canyon floor. The creek then drops over the main falls, which pours out of a small gully that resembles a hanging valley, while a small trickle of water splits off towards the right bank and drops along with the main cascade into a round, rock-bound clear pool. The creek exits the pool in a small congregation of rocks.

== Access ==
Tip Toe Falls is accessed by the 2-mile (3.2 km) Iverson Trail, which begins at the park visitor center. Iverson Trail begins on the north side of the Nature Center. The Sequoia Nature Trail begins on the south side of the Nature Center and eventually meets the Iverson Trail. The trail eventually comes to the mouth of Fall Creek, and a narrow side trail winds upstream. The side trail soon comes to the end of the canyon, where two rock walls slope down in a “V” shape and form the low cliff that Tip Toe Falls pours over.

To access the upper falls, one must scramble up the right side of Tip Toe Falls. (The left side is more wet and mossy, and is thus more dangerous to climb.) After walking upstream along the bed of Fall Creek, the upper falls is found on the left of the canyon, obscured by several fallen trees.

== See also ==
- List of waterfalls
- List of waterfalls in California
