= Orthograde posture =

Manner of walking

Orthograde locomotion of a sifaka lemur.

Orthograde is a term derived from Greek ὀρθός, orthos ("right", "true", "straight") + Latin gradi (to walk) that describes a manner of walking in an upright posture, with the independent motion of limbs. Both New and Old World monkeys are primarily arboreal, and they have a tendency to walk with their limbs swinging in parallel to one another. This differs from the manner of walking demonstrated by the apes.

Chimpanzees, gorillas, orangutans and humans, when walking, walk upright, and their limbs swing in opposition to one another for balance (unlike monkeys, apes lack a tail to use for balance). Disadvantages related to upright walking do exist for primates, since their primary mode of locomotion is quadrupedalism. This upright locomotion is called "orthograde posture". Orthograde posture in humans was made possible through millions of years of evolution. In order to walk upright with maximum efficiency, the skull, spine, pelvis, lower limbs, and feet all underwent evolutionary changes.

== Origin ==
The definition of orthograde posture can easily be derived from its roots “ortho-” meaning “upright” and “-grade” meaning “ascent.” This was true for the early hominidae, whose transition to upright walking took place approximately six to seven million years ago evident in Orrorin tugenensis. These hominin were some of the first bipeds who propagated forward one leg at a time, step by step.

== Evolutionary significance ==
The first definitive evidence of habitual orthograde posture in human evolutionary lineage begins with Ardipithecus ramidus, dating between 5.2 and 5.8 million years ago. The skeletal remains of this hominid exhibit a mosaic of morphological characteristics that would have been both adapted to an arboreal environment and walking upright terrestrially. The earliest evidence of a hominid exhibiting skeletal morphology capable of achieving orthograde posture dates to 9.5 million years ago, with the discovery of a Miocene ape, Dryopithecus in Can Llobateres, Spain.

Several million years after Orrorin tugenensis, australopithecines such as Au. africanus and Au. afarensis also practiced habitual bipedalism. These tree-dwellers were arboreal and inhabited the wooded areas of forest canopies. Some hominin in that time period still used knuckle walking, a practice common in other apes. However habitual bipedalism in australopiths meant though they nested among the branches in trees at night, they moved with orthograde posture such that their hands could also be used for gathering, feeding, weight transfer, or balance during the day. From fossil evidence and hypotheses state that upright posture was a quintessential reaction to changes in environment and competition. Due to the more wooded barren savannahs of northern Africa, O. tugenensis and australopiths began to change, which is evident in morphological data accumulated from the remains of the different species. These major morphological changes differentiate them from pronograde hominin seen in the skull, vertebral column, pelvis, and femur fossils.

== Morphological characteristics ==
Annotated human shoulder.

In order for animals to have the ability to walk upright, there are certain anatomical requirements. For mammals that exhibit orthograde posture, the scapula is more dorsally placed than in animals with a pronograde posture. The scapular index, the measure of width to length of the scapula, is decreased in animals exhibiting orthograde posture. This means that the scapula is broader than it is long. The rib cage is more flattened and the acromion process on the scapula is much larger. This is because there is more of a need for the deltoid muscle in orthograde posture, due to the availability of resource manipulation by the freeing up of hands.

== Morphological changes ==
In 1924, the discovery of remains of the Taung Child in South Africa provided further evidence of bipedalism and orthograde posture. The skull belonged to a three-year-old child, later identified as Australopithecus africanus. The skull was an indicator of orthograde posture because of the location and orientation of the foramen magnum. The foramen magnum is the space in the skull that acts as the bridge to the central nervous system from the spinal cord to the brain. For animals with "pronograde posture, the foramen magnum is dorsally oriented, whereas in humans it is anteriorly located and forwardly inclined. In the Taung Child despite lacking the forward inclination seen in humans, the foramen magnum is also anteriorly oriented. Similarly in Australopithecus afarensis, the site of the space in the skull is even more human-like, inferiorly located such that the spinal cord would run perpendicularly to the ground. Relating this orientation to the encephalization of hominin of the time, the position foramen magnum assisted in balance and supported upright posture.

More evidence in hominidae that enabled orthograde posture is present in the vertical column or lumbar vertebra of Australopithecus afarensis. The human lumbar column consists of five vertebrae that connect the twelve thoracic vertebrae to the sacrum and pelvis. Primates with pronograde posture such as gorillas have four lumbar vertebrae that connect to twelve thoracic vertebrae. The difference in vertebra number results in a greater range of movement for humans with less thoracic vertebrae than gorillas with more lumbar vertebrae. Au. afarensis has six total lumbar vertebrae with also twelve thoracic vertebra Another key characteristic that enforced upright posture in hominin was the shape of the lumbar vertebra. The “s” shape of the lumbar vertebra is called spinal lordosis, which produces the unique convex curvature seen in upright bipeds. The vertebral column of australopith fossils also share the curved morphology of modern humans. Lordosis in the lower lumbar spine centers the mass of the body on the lower joints such as the pelvis and femur such that the body is self-stabilizing and can remain upright.

The earliest habitual bipeds of the hominins were Orrorin tungenenisis. Evidence draws from three femur fragments, including the left shaft and head, and the head of the right femur. Linking the legs to the pelvis and lumbar vertebra, the femur quintessentially supports body weight as it is transferred from the pelvis to the knee and lower limbs. The femoral neck specifically, which connects the head of the femur to its primary shaft absorbs the force of impact when an upright biped assumes movement. In Orrorin tugenensis, the orientation of the head condyles of the broadened femur is wider and thicker in comparison to that of chimpanzees and other great apes.

== See also ==
- Bipedalism
- Pronograde
