= Prehensility =

Quality of an appendage or organ that has adapted for grasping or holding

Prehensility is the quality of an appendage or organ that has adapted for grasping or holding. The word is derived from the Latin term prehendere, meaning "to grasp". The ability to grasp is likely derived from a number of different origins. The most common are tree-climbing and the need to manipulate food.

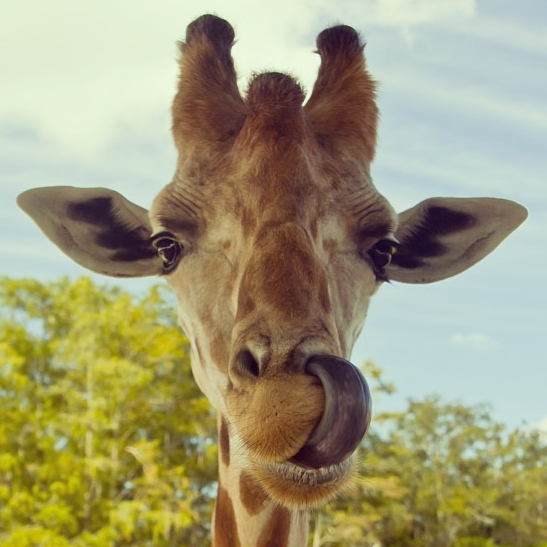
Giraffe's prehensile tongue

== Examples ==
Appendages that can become prehensile include:

Hands and
feet
- The hands of primates are all prehensile to varying degrees
- The front paws of raccoons and many of their relatives are prehensile.
- The feet of passerine birds can be prehensile or podileptic.

Tails
- New World monkeys have prehensile tails
- Tails of many extant lizards (geckos, chameleons, and a species of skink) are prehensile
- Seahorses grip seaweed with their tails.
- Several fossil animals have been interpreted as having prehensile tails, including several Late Triassic drepanosaurs, and possibly the Late Permian synapsid Suminia.

Tongue
- Giraffes', anteaters' and lizards' tongues in particular are prehensile
- Some other ungulates' tongues are also prehensile to a lesser extent

Nose
- The noses of elephants and tapirs are prehensile

Lip or lips
- Lips of lake sturgeon, orangutans, horses, and rhinos
- Upper lip of the West Indian manatee

Tentacles
- Arms of octopuses, squid, and the cirri of nautiluses
- To a limited extent, the tentacles of sea anemones, hydra, and a few other invertebrates can grasp and move objects

== Uses ==
Human feet prehensility example, done with everyday objects

Prehensility affords animals a great natural advantage in manipulating their environment for feeding, climbing, digging, and defense. It enables many animals, such as primates, to use tools to complete tasks that would otherwise be impossible without highly specialized anatomy. For example, chimpanzees have the ability to use sticks to obtain termites and grubs in a manner similar to human fishing. However, not all prehensile organs are applied to tool use; the giraffe tongue, for instance, is instead used in feeding and self-cleaning.

== See also ==
- Robot end effector
