= Grasp =

Physical act with the hand

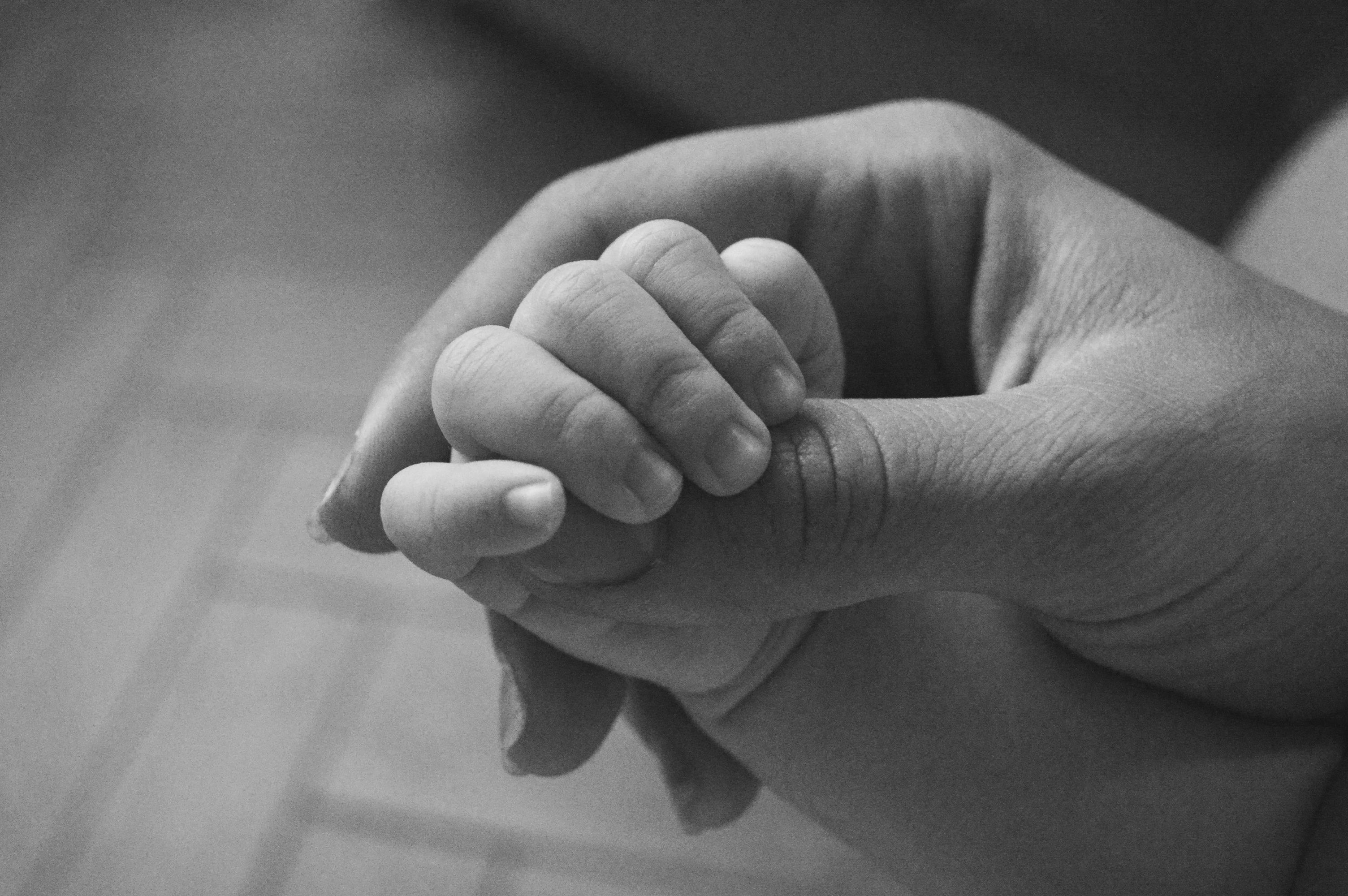
For newborns, grasping is a natural reflex.

A grasp is an act of taking, holding or seizing firmly with (or as if with) the hand. An example of a grasp is the handshake, wherein two people grasp one of each other's like hands.

In zoology particularly, prehensility is the quality of an appendage or organ that has adapted for grasping or holding.

Grasping is often preceded by reaching, which is highly dependent on head and trunk control, as well as eye control and gaze.

== Development ==
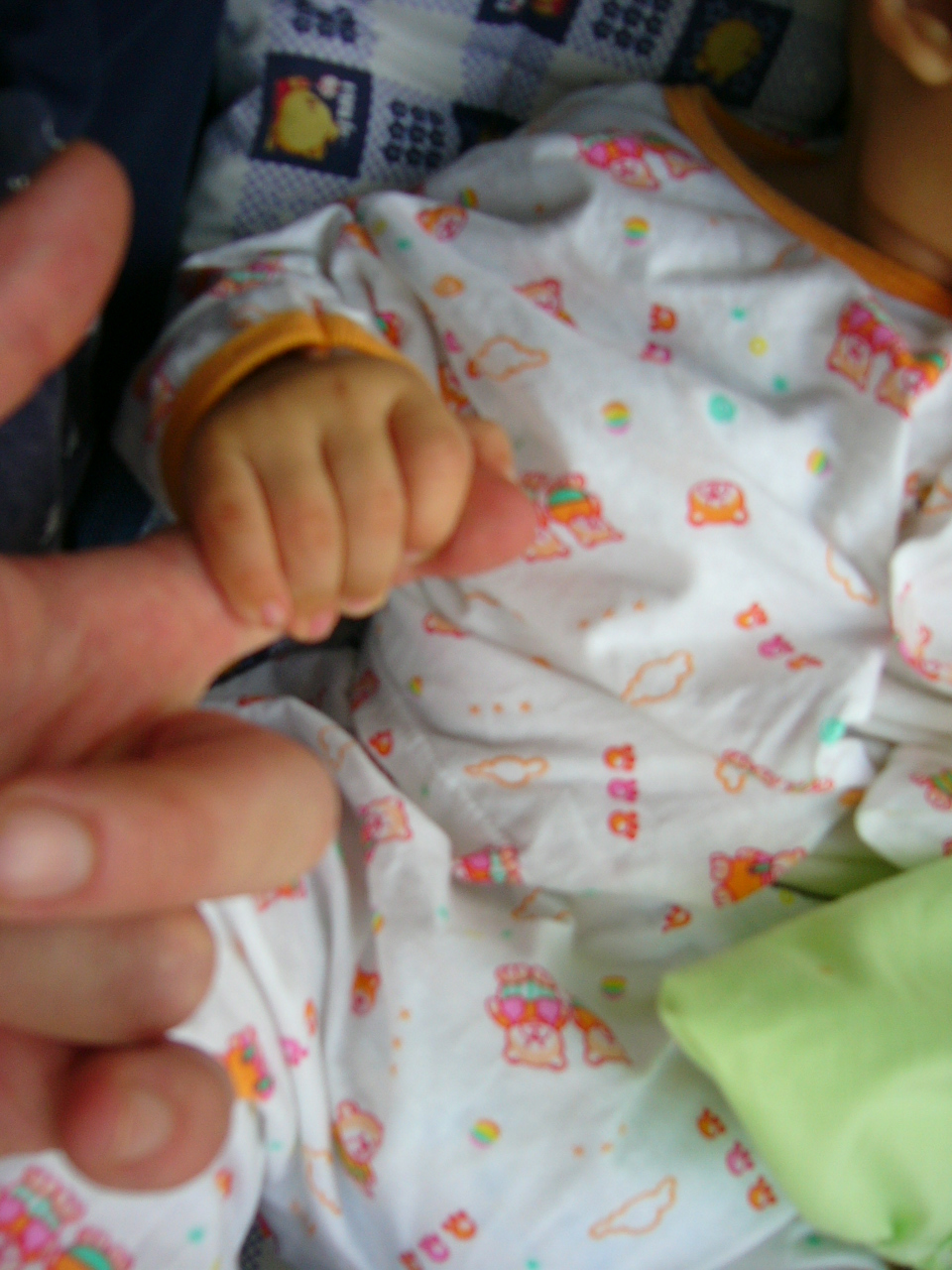
Grasp reflex of a 5-month-old baby boy

The development of grasping is an important component of child development stages, wherein the main types of grasps are:

- Raking grasp, wherein the fingers, but not including the thumb, do all the holding.
- Palmar grasp, wherein the fingers squeeze against the palm, instead of against themselves as in the raking grasp. Children are usually able to use a palmar grasp by the age of 6 months.
- Pincer grasp wherein the pointer finger and the thumb squeeze to grasp an object. Children are usually able to use a pincer grasp by the age of 9 to 10 months.

Infants reach as early as 16 weeks of age and are able to perform certain actions that lead to grasping objects. The act of grasping is a two-stage motor skill that develops. The first stage, infants will reach out towards the desired object. In the second stage, the infants will then clench fingers once the object has made contact with the palm and close. Infants try to grasp an object before it is within reach by initiating arm and hand movements. The child will extend their grip more than necessary because their perception is less developed than an adult's grip. Infants progress their grasping skills throughout time by practice and providing objects that are reachable. It is essential to provide infants with objects they can grasp in order to progress and further their development of the grasping skill; exposing infants to new objects to practice grasping will overall benefit this primitive motor skill and elevate the associated cognitive process. Infants develop their reaching and grasping from making just contact with their hands, to using their palms to contact an object. Infant grasp is an extension of reaching and develops between six and nine months of age. Stable patterns of reaching in order to grasp continue to develop as the child grows and matures. By the age of 6, children are now learning hand placement on the writing utensil the correct way.

=== Types of hand movements ===
Hand grasps can be grouped into taxonomies according to qualitative and quantitative properties, leading to specific clusters of movements. In terms of synergies, there are three categories of hand movements. Simple synergies are present, when all the components of the hand are moving in a similar pattern. Conversely, it is called reciprocal synergies, when the fingers or thumbs are working in different patterns. Finally, sequential patterns are specific hand movements performed in a specific order. Synergies are fundamental for controlling complex hand movements, such as the ones of the hand during grasping. The importance of synergies has been demonstrated for both muscle control and in the kinematic domain in several studies, lately on studies including large cohorts of subjects.

=== Reflex ===
The palmar grasp reflex (sometimes simply called grasp reflex) is among the primitive reflexes and appears at birth and persists until five or six months of age. When an object is placed in the infant's hand and strokes their palm, the fingers will close and they will grasp it. The grip is strong but unpredictable; though it may be able to support the child's weight, they may also release their grip suddenly and without warning. The reverse motion can be induced by stroking the back or side of the hand.
