= Hindlimb =

Limb attached on the posterior of a terrestrial tetrapod vertebrate's torso

A hindlimb or back limb is one of the paired articulated appendages (limbs) attached on the caudal (posterior) end of a terrestrial tetrapod vertebrate's torso. With reference to quadrupeds, the term hindleg or back leg is often used instead. In bipedal animals with an upright posture (e.g. humans and some primates), the term lower limb is often used.

== Location ==
It is located on the limb of an animal. Hindlimbs are present in a large number of quadrupeds. Though it is a posterior limb, it can cause lameness in some animals. The way of walking through hindlimbs are called bipedalism.

== Benefits of hindlimbs ==
Hindlimbs are helpful in many ways, some examples are:

=== Frogs ===
Frogs can easily adapt at the surroundings using hindlimbs. The main reason is it can jump high to easily escape to its predator and also to catch prey. It can perform some tricks using the hindlimbs such as the somersault and hindersault. Frogs have 4 digits in fore limb while hindlimb have five digits. All digits are without nails.

=== Birds ===
All birds walk using hindlimbs. They have the ability to dig in two opposite directions using the hindlimbs. They can easily find food that makes them adapt on their surroundings. A bird with a forelimb that is very primitive is the Archaeopteryx. It adapted by using it but it was not capable of long-distance flights, leading to its extinction. The fastest biped is the ostrich. It runs at 70 km/h.

=== Kangaroo rats ===
Bipedality in kangaroo rats are seen to be an agent of adaptation. Kangaroo rats are long jumpers that can jump up to 18 feet, (that is twice the highest possible long jump and also high jump).

Using hindlimbs they can survive a challenging ecosystem. They can easily find food and survive hindrances in the environment. Some species use hindlimbs for competition.

== First bipeds ==
The first vertebrate bipeds were the Bolosaurids, a group of prehistoric reptiles with no living relatives. The first one, Eudibamus, was a small, fast runner during the Permian Period.

== See also ==
- Forelimb
