= Weight-bearing =

Orthopedics term

Weight-bearing or weightbearing refers to the act of putting the structural load of one's own weight onto one or more parts of the body. In biology, it usually refers to a terrestrial animal supporting the position and posture of its own core against gravity using limbs, legs or other appendages. In bipedal animals such as humans, weight-bearing is predominantly performed by the lower limbs.

In clinical medicine, particularly the field of orthopedics and physiotherapy, the term is used to describe the amount of weight a patient can safely put on an injured body part. Generally, it refers to a leg, ankle or foot that has been fractured or upon which surgery has been performed, but the term can also be used to refer to resting on an arm or a wrist. In general, it is described as a percentage of the body weight, because each leg of a healthy person carries the full body weight when walking, in an alternating fashion. For example, after surgery on the hip, leg, ankle or foot, it is of the utmost importance for recovery to get the right amount of weight-bearing when moving around with crutches or frames in order to prevent accidental bone displacement and malunion

The grades of weight-bearing for each phase of recovery will be determined by the surgeon. The Anti-Gravity Treadmill can allow testing of weight bearing by lowering effective body weight in 1% increments from 100 to 20% of body weight.

== Grades ==
- Non-weight-bearing (NWB): The leg must not touch the floor and is not permitted to support any weight at all. The patient may hop on the other leg or use crutches or other devices for mobility. In this grade, 0% of the body weight may be rested on the leg.
- Touch-down weight-bearing or Toe-touch weight-bearing: The foot or toes may touch the floor (such as to maintain balance), but not support any weight. Do not place actual weight on the affected leg. Imagine having an egg underfoot that one is not to crush.
- Partial weight-bearing: A small amount of weight may be supported by the affected leg. The weight may be gradually increased up to 50% of the body weight, which would permit the affected person to stand with his body weight evenly supported by both feet (but not to walk).
- Weight-bearing as tolerated: Usually assigned to people that can support from 50 to 100% of the body weight on the affected leg, the affected person independently chooses the weight supported by the extremity. The amount tolerated may vary according to the circumstances.
- Full weight-bearing: The leg can now carry 100% of the body weight, which permits normal walking.
