= Deep social mind =

Deep social mind is a concept in evolutionary psychology; it refers to the distinctively human capacity to 'read' (that is, to infer) the mental states of others while reciprocally enabling those others to read one's own mental states at the same time. The term 'deep social mind' was first coined in 1999 by Andrew Whiten, professor of Evolutionary and Developmental Psychology at St. Andrews University, Scotland. Together with closely related terms such as 'reflexivity' and 'intersubjectivity', it is now well-established among scholars investigating the evolutionary emergence of human sociality, cognition and communication.

== Mind-reading in apes and humans ==
It is widely agreed that the brain is social in both human and nonhuman primates. But, according to Andrew Whiten, human sociality goes much further than ape sociality. Ape social intelligence is overwhelmingly 'Machiavellian' in the sense of manipulating others in social settings.

One consequence is that while an ape may be motivated to 'read' (that is, to infer) the mental states of others around it, it has little motive to reciprocate. Instead of making its own mental states transparent to potential rivals, it seeks to block others from 'reading' its own mind. For example, one way to infer what another primate might be thinking is to detect which way its head is pointed, so as to reconstruct what it might be looking at. In the case of gorillas and chimpanzees, adult apes have evolved eyes which give away very little information concerning direction of gaze. Their eyes are dark-on-dark: the iris is dark brown or even black and the same applies to the sclera and surrounding skin. Looking at the eyes, therefore, it is not easy to detect direction of gaze. In the human case, the eyes are very different, the dark iris standing out against a white surrounding sclera. This feature, combined with the relatively large size of the human eye and its horizontally elongated shape, assists neighbouring conspecifics to detect direction of gaze and, on that basis, engage in mind-reading.

According to the 'deep social mind' theory, this means that humans have become cognitively adapted to reflexivity and intersubjectivity: as a species, we are well-adapted to read the minds of trusted others while at the same time assisting those others in reading our own minds. One consequence of this is self-awareness or 'egocentric perspective reversal': I read your mind as you are reading mine. Therefore, between us, we can gain an awareness of our own minds as if from the outside: my mental states as these are reflected in yours and yours as they are reflected in mine. In that sense, if this argument is accepted, our minds mutually interpenetrate. 'Mind' in the human sense is not locked inside this or that skull but instead is relational, stretching between us. According to evolutionary psychologist Michael Tomasello, a human child normally achieves egocentric perspective reversal—viewing its own mental states as if from the standpoint of others—at around one year of age.

== See also ==
- Chimpanzee intelligence
- Cooperative eye hypothesis
- Great ape language
- Hominid intelligence
- Intersubjectivity
- Mirror neuron
- Origin of language
- Origin of speech
- Origins of society
- Primate cognition
- Primate empathy
- Reflexivity
- Simulation theory of empathy
- Theory of mind
