= Alison Jolly =

American primatologist (1937–2014)

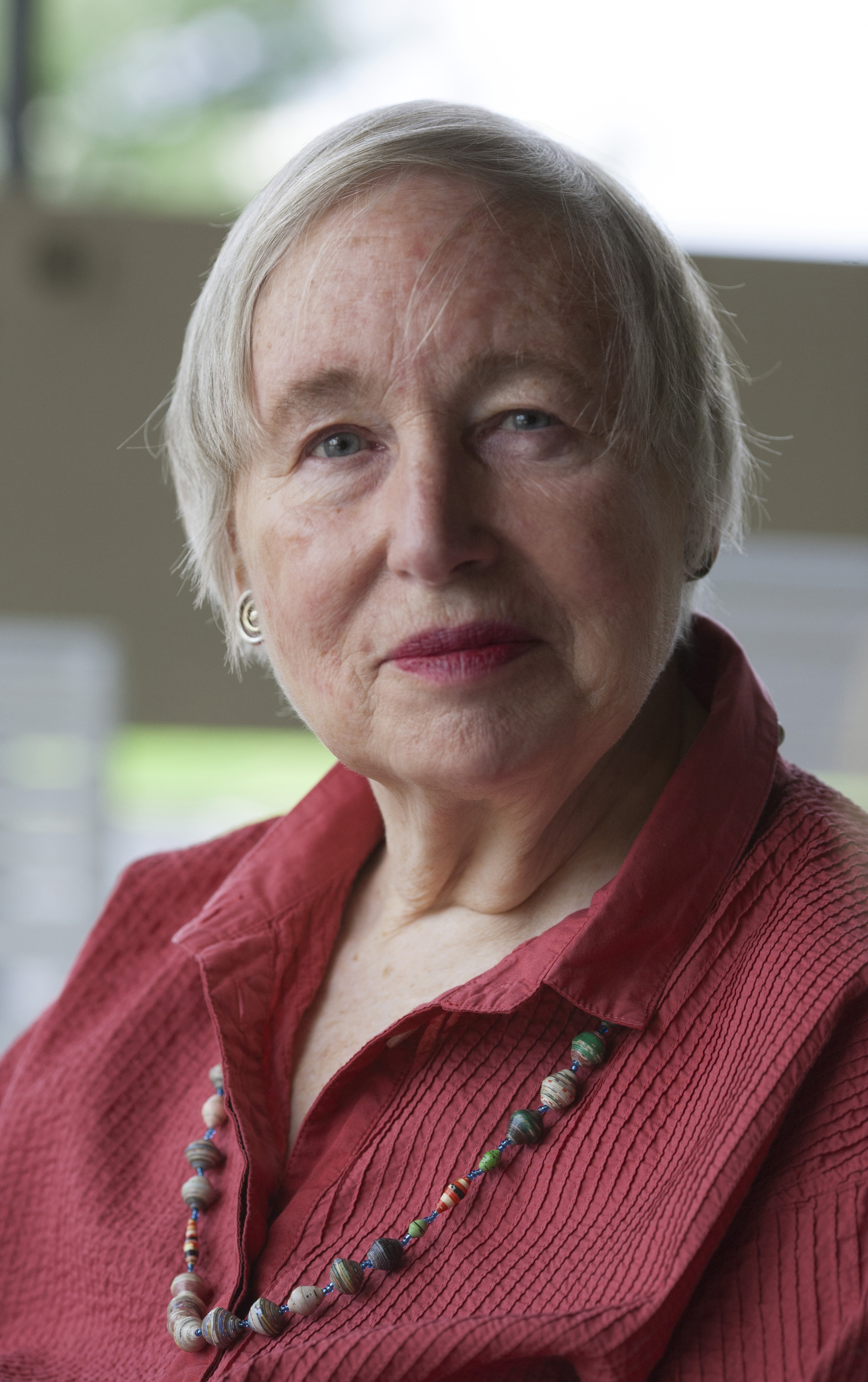
- Jolly in 2011
- Born: Alison Bishop; May 9, 1937; Ithaca, New York, United States
- Died: February 6, 2014 (aged 76); Lewes, East Sussex, England
- Known for: Lemur biological studies
- Spouse: Richard Jolly (m. 1964–2014)
- Children: 4, including Arthur
- Scientific career
- Fields: primatology

Alison Jolly (born Alison Bishop: May 9, 1937 – February 6, 2014) was an American primatologist known for her studies of lemurs. She wrote several books for both popular and scientific audiences and conducted extensive fieldwork in Madagascar, primarily at the Berenty Reserve.

Jolly was also the first scientist to identify and propose female dominance in a primate society. She also played a key roll in identifying the importance of social behavior in the evolution of primate intelligence.

== Biography ==
Born on May 9, 1937, in Ithaca, New York, to painter Alison Mason Kingsbury and poet Morris Bishop, Jolly held a BA from Cornell University, and a PhD from Yale University. She had been a researcher at the New York Zoological Society, Cambridge University, University of Sussex, Rockefeller University, and Princeton University. In 1998, she was made Officer of the National Order of Madagascar (Officier de l'Ordre National, Madagascar). At the time of her death she was a visiting scientist at the University of Sussex.

Under her maiden name, she published "Control of the Hand in Lower Primates" in 1962. Jolly began studying lemur behavior at Berenty in 1963. She noted that while lemurs lack monkeys' ability to learn about and manipulate objects, they showed similarly strong social skills. At the time, it was commonly believed that solving technical and foraging challenges is what fueled the advancement of primate intelligence. But Jolly's field work led her to conclude that social living preceded foraging skills and thus played a more central role. In so doing, Jolly laid the seminal groundwork for Richard Byrne, Andrew Whiten, and Frans de Waal to later develop the social intelligence hypothesis.

In a 1984 study, Jolly suggested that the female prosimians she observed may dominate males — becoming the first scientist to identify female dominance.

Jolly encouraged field studies that contributed to knowledge about Malagasy wildlife and advised many researchers; she briefed Jane Wilson-Howarth and colleagues before their first expedition to Madagascar in 1981. Since 1990, Jolly had returned for every birthing season to carry out research assisted by student volunteers. She focused on ring-tailed lemur demography, ranging, and especially inter-troop and territorial behavior, in the context of the fivefold difference in population density from front to back of the reserve.

Her scientific books include Lemur Behavior: A Madagascar Field Study, The Evolution of Primate Behavior and Lucy's Legacy: Sex and Intelligence in Human Evolution. Her non-technical works include Madagascar: A World Out of Time and Lords & Lemurs: Mad Scientists, Kings With Spears, and the Survival of Diversity in Madagascar. She also wrote numerous articles for consumer magazines and scientific journals.

Jolly was the author of two series of children's books—The Ako Books and The Fiddle Stories. In 2005, she published the first story in the series of Ako Books. The purpose of this series of books is to teach to children around the world about the different types of lemurs and their critical habitats in Madagascar.

== Eponym ==
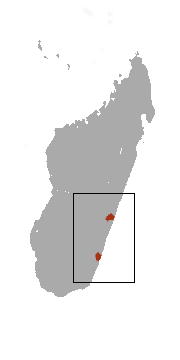
Jolly's Mouse Lemur area

In June 2006, a new species of mouse lemur, Microcebus jollyae, was named for Jolly.

== Personal life ==
In 1963, Alison Jolly married Richard Jolly, the development economist. She died at home in Lewes, in February 6, 2014, aged 76. Her son Arthur is a playwright and screenwriter.

== Publications ==
- Lemur Behavior: A Madagascar Field Study, University of Chicago Press, 1966
- The Evolution of Primate Behavior, New York, 1972
- Play: Its Role in Development and Evolution, New York, 1976
- A World Like Our Own; Man and Nature in Madagascar, Yale University Press, 1980
- Madagascar: A World Out of Time, 1984 with Frans Lanting & Gerald Durrell
- Madagascar, Key Environments Series, Pergamon Press, Oxford, 1984
- Lucy's Legacy: Sex and Intelligence in Human Evolution, Cambridge. Harvard University Press, 1999
- Lords and Lemurs: Mad Scientists, Kings with Spears, and the Survival of Diversity in Madagascar. Boston, Houghton Mifflin. 2004
- Ringtailed Lemur Biology: Lemur catta in Madagascar. New York, Springer. 2006
- Thank You, Madagascar: The Conservation Diaries of Alison Jolly, 2015

== Children's books ==
- Ny aiay Ako (Ako the Aye-Aye), 2005
- Bitika the Mouselemur, (2012)
- Tik-Tik the Ringtailed Lemur, (2012)
- Bounce the White Sifaka, (2012)
- Furry and Fuzzy the Red Ruffed Lemur Twin, (2012)
- No-Song the Indri, (2012)
- Fiddle and the See-Throughs, (2013)
- Fiddle and the Flint-Boy, (2013)
- Fiddle and the Headless Horseman, (2013)
- Fiddle and the Falling Tower, (2013)
- Fiddle and the Smugglers, (2013)
- Fiddle and the Fires, (2013)
