= Nicholas Humphrey =

British neuropsychologist (born 1943)

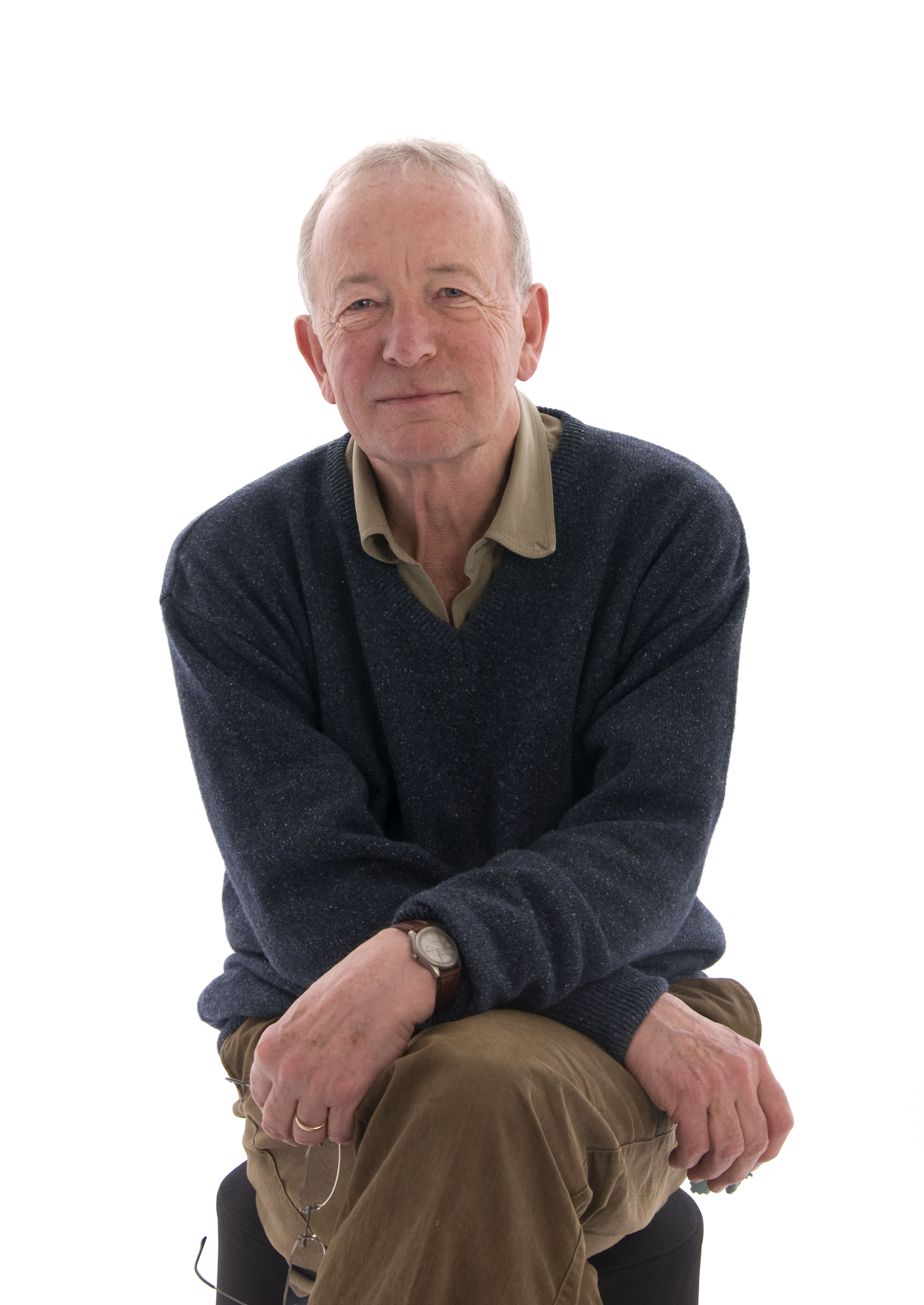
- Humphrey in 2010
- Born: Nicholas Keynes Humphrey; 27 March 1943 (age 83); London, England
- Education: Trinity College, Cambridge
- Known for: Social intelligence, Blindsight, Evolutionary psychology of consciousness
- Spouse(s): Caroline Humphrey (m. 1967; div. 1977); Ayla Kohn (m. 1994)
- Children: 2
- Awards: Martin Luther King Memorial Prize, Pufendorf Medal, Mind & Brain Prize, Dennett Prize

Nicholas Keynes Humphrey (born 27 March 1943) is an English neuropsychologist and writer who has investigated the evolution of consciousness and social intelligence. He carried out early research on visual perception after cortical damage in monkeys and collaborated with Lawrence Weiskrantz in research that led to the discovery of blindsight. He moved into ethology and, after doing fieldwork with mountain gorillas, was one of the first to formulate the social intelligence hypothesis. His more recent research, in collaboration especially with Daniel Dennett, has concentrated on the science and philosophy of phenomenal consciousness. His work builds towards a materialist theory of conscious experience in humans and animals, that explains it as a life-affirming illusion. These ideas, popularised in books including A History of the Mind (1992), Seeing Red (2006), Soul Dust (2011) and Sentience (2023), have had considerable impact but remain controversial.

Humphrey has held academic posts at the University of Oxford, the University of Cambridge, The New School for Social Research in New York, and the London School of Economics. He has presented television series on the development of the human mind and topics such as nuclear disarmament and belief in the supernatural.

== Family and early life ==
Humphrey was born in London, into what The New Yorker described as "an illustrious family of intellectuals". His father, John H. Humphrey, was a pioneering immunologist and his mother, Janet Humphrey (née Hill), a psychoanalyst who worked with Anna Freud. His paternal grandfather was the inventor H. A. Humphrey, and his great-aunt Edith Humphrey the first British woman to receive a doctorate in chemistry. His maternal grandparents were the Nobel-Prize winning physiologist, A. V. Hill (later, member of parliament for Cambridge University), and the welfare pioneer Margaret Hill, sister of economist John Maynard Keynes.

Humphrey described the "family affair" of science in the 2004 book Curious Minds. "I grew up feeling I carried a warrant to explore anything I chose, that I could indeed safely cross into areas 'Not for Everybody.' "

== Education ==
Humphrey attended a boarding prep school and Westminster School (1956–61) He acted in school plays, including Shakespeare and Euripides (in Greek). He read widely and kept a commonplace book, which he maintained into later life. At Westminster, he and his physics teacher designed an experiment to measure the speed of light using equipment set up along a London street.

In his autobiography, Stephen Hawking recalls that in 1958, when he was sixteen and his family went to India for a year, he "stayed with the family of Dr. John Humphrey at their house in Mill Hill. The house had a basement that contained steam engines and other models made by John Humphrey’s father". Humphrey (two years younger) recalls him as "quizzical" and "somewhat bossy".

In 1961 Humphrey went up to Trinity College, Cambridge on a scholarship, initially to read mathematics and physics. But he soon switched to physiology and psychology. His physiology tutor, Giles Brindley, introduced him to experimental neuroscience in dramatic fashion: Humphrey encountered Brindley standing in a salt bath, wearing a helmet from which a metal rod projected against his right eye, through which Brindley was passing electric current to his retina to study phosphenes, inspired by an experiment of Isaac Newton in the 1660s.

While an undergraduate, Humphrey edited with John Barrell the literary magazine Granta, the only scientist in the history of the magazine to do so.

== Academic career ==
=== Cambridge and blindsight ===
Humphrey's doctoral research at Cambridge was notable for his pioneering study of a rhesus monkey, Helen, whose primary visual cortex had been surgically removed by his supervisor Lawrence Weiskrantz. When Humphrey first encountered Helen, she appeared to be completely blind. But, on a hunch that she might still be capable of using the subcortical mid-brain visual system, he decided to try new methods of "teaching her to see". He quickly established that she was capable of much more than anyone expected. He went on to work with this monkey for the next seven years (taking her with him to Oxford and then back to Cambridge). Her vision improved so far that eventually she was able to run around an arena, deftly avoiding obstacles, picking up tiny currants from the floor. When Humphrey and Daniel Dennett showed a film of Helen at a seminar of psychologists and philosophers "nobody guessed the truth: Helen was cortically blind".

The findings with Helen encouraged Weiskrantz to investigate comparable phenomena in humans. Working with a patient known as D.B., who was blind in part of his visual field following brain damage, Weiskrantz and colleagues showed that D.B. could accurately "guess" the location of stimuli despite reporting no visual awareness. They termed this capacity blindsight, a dissociation between visual performance and conscious experience that has become central to contemporary research on consciousness.

The explanation of blindsight remains contested, with some critics claiming it is merely “degraded” normal vision. Humphrey himself characterizes it as perception without sensation. In a 2025 paper he has argued that blindsight is not strictly “unconscious”: rather it is a case of cognitive consciousness in the absence of phenomenal consciousness, i.e. “insentient vision”; and he suggested it is a return to an evolutionarily primitive stage, “the vision of fish and frogs”

=== Oxford and evolutionary aesthetics ===
After completing his doctorate, Humphrey became Lecturer in Psychology at the University of Oxford in 1967. There he investigated visual and colour preferences in monkeys and developed an evolutionary account of aesthetic response, based around the cognitive appeal of “rhyme”. His essay "The Illusion of Beauty", based on this work, was broadcast on BBC Radio and won the Glaxo Science Writers Prize in 1980. 50 years later he has returned to this theme in a book to be published in October 2026, "Why is the World so Beautiful?: Our Minds in Search of Nature's Rhymes".

=== Cambridge, fieldwork, and social intelligence ===
Humphrey returned to Cambridge in 1970 as Assistant Director of the Sub-Department of Animal Behaviour, joining a department shaped by the ethologists Robert Hinde and Patrick Bateson. In this environment he developed the Darwinian approach to understanding mind and behaviour that became central to his later work.

In 1971 he spent several months at Dian Fossey's gorilla study camp in the Virunga Mountains and later visited Richard Leakey's archaeological field site at Lake Turkana. These field experiences, combined with laboratory work on primate cognition, informed his thinking about the evolution of intelligence.

Humphrey noted that gorillas could display sophisticated problem-solving abilities under experimental conditions yet appeared to live relatively simple lives in the wild, with abundant food, few predators and limited need for complex tool use. This perceived mismatch between cognitive capacity and environmental demands led him to focus on social, rather than ecological, pressures in cognitive evolution.

In "The Social Function of Intellect" (1976), Humphrey argued that the advanced cognitive abilities of primates evolved primarily to deal with complex social environments rather than to solve purely ecological problems such as foraging or predator avoidance. This thesis paralleled Alison Jolly's earlier 1966 observations of lemur social structures, which likewise emphasised the social context of primate intelligence. In Humphrey’s view, highly social animals must become "natural psychologists", using conscious introspection to model the minds of conspecifics. This work has been recognized as giving rise to the social intelligence hypothesis and the idea of “mind-reading”.

=== "The Inner Eye" television series ===
In 1984 Humphrey resigned his academic post at Cambridge to write and present a Channel 4 television series, The Inner Eye, on the development of the human mind, broadcast in 1986 alongside a companion book of the same title. The Times newspaper described the TV series as "A rare series that inspires thought. . . a genuine advance in television technique."

=== Collaboration with Daniel Dennett ===
In 1987 Humphrey joined philosopher Daniel Dennett at the Center for Cognitive Studies at Tufts University, collaborating on an empirically oriented theory of consciousness. During this period Humphrey also worked on Multiple Personality Disorder, exploring whether distinct personalities might correspond to distinct streams of consciousness.

=== Darwin College and parapsychology research ===
In 1992 Humphrey was appointed to a Senior Research Fellowship at Darwin College, Cambridge, funded by the Perrott-Warrick Fellowship in parapsychology. He used this position to conduct a sceptical investigation of parapsychological claims, examining phenomena such as extra-sensory perception and psychokinesis. This research led to the book Soul Searching: Human Nature and Supernatural Belief (1995), published in the United States as Leaps of Faith.

=== London School of Economics and psychopathology ===
In 1998 Humphrey took up a Senior Research Fellowship in Evolutionary Psychopathology at the London School of Economics, where he continued his theoretical work on consciousness and began a series of investigations into the placebo effect. He argued that the brain manages bodily healing resources through what he and John Skoyles term a "health management system. In this account, the body retains reserve healing capacities that are normally inhibited; placebo responses are thought to work by convincing this system to lift its restraints.

== Anti-nuclear activism ==
Humphrey became involved in the anti-nuclear movement in the late 1970s during the Cold War. In 1981 he delivered the Bronowski Memorial Lecture on the BBC, titled "Four Minutes to Midnight", referring to the Doomsday Clock of the Bulletin of the Atomic Scientists, which then stood at four minutes to midnight.

Broadcast on BBC2 on 23 October 1981, the lecture analysed psychological factors that, in his view, inhibited effective public response to the nuclear threat. "We behave at times as though we have been hexed by the Bomb, put under a spell". The BBC received "80 letters of appreciation, many of them from doctors and scientists". James Cameron in his column in the Guardian wrote: "I was depressed to the limit and exhilarated to the sky by the BBC Bronowski lecture by Dr Nicholas Humphrey [...] Dr Humphrey’s programme alone justified the invention of the telly". The 1986 BBC Annual Report noted that the Bronowski Memorial Lectures, which had begun in 1977, were terminated after his talk.

With psychiatrist Robert Jay Lifton, Humphrey co-edited the anthology In a Dark Time (1984), a collection of writings on war, peace and life under the shadow of nuclear annihilation. The novelist, John Fowles, wrote in a review that “This book is the most painful and the most important published for many a long year". The book received the Martin Luther King Memorial Prize.

== Reception and influence ==
His 1976 essay "The Social Function of Intellect" has been widely cited as a foundational statement of the social intelligence and Machiavellian intelligence hypotheses in primate and human evolution. In the introduction to their edited volume Machiavellian Intelligence (1988), Andrew Whiten and Richard Byrne stated that "Humphrey's essay is the single most important seed from which much of the research reported in this book has grown." The anthropologist Michael Carrithers devoted a substantial portion of his book Why Humans Have Cultures (1992) to assessing the importance of Humphrey's theory, writing that "Humphrey's ideas blend harmoniously with others in a wide river of continuing research in human evolution, psychology, behavioural ecology, socio-linguistics, social anthropology and even philosophy."

Philosopher Dennett has claimed that "It was Nick who had discovered blindsight, in Larry Weiskrantz's lab".

His theories of consciousness, emphasising the primacy of sensation, the role of feedback loops and the evolutionary function of subjective experience, have been both influential and also controversial. They have prompted discussion about the adaptive value of phenomenality and the distribution of sentience among non-human animals. Reviewing Seeing Red (2006) in the journal Brain, philosopher Daniel Dennett described Humphrey as "unique in his combination of audacity and circumspection, an intellectual tightrope walker".

As a public intellectual, Humphrey has combined scientific research with communication through books, broadcasts and public lectures. Commentators have noted his use of literary and philosophical references alongside empirical science in addressing questions about consciousness and human nature. Dennett in his autobiography noted this combination of science and literature:

Nick has a wealth of articles published in Nature, the leading science journal in the UK, so he is undoubtedly a scientist of stature, but he is also deeply and knowledgeably in love with literature and history, always ready to adorn his writing with the perfect quote from Shakespeare or some other great thinker of the past.

== Critical reviews ==
Humphrey’s books have met with both praise and hostility within the academic community.

=== Seeing Red ===
In Artificial Intelligence, Natika Newton called the book "an invaluable contribution to the mind-body debate", describing its approach to selfhood as "straightforward, parsimonious, and intuitively plausible". However, she acknowledged that Humphrey had not fully explained how qualitative differences between specific sensations (e.g., red vs. pain) could be commensurate with differences in bodily responses. Josh Weisberg, writing in Nature, described Seeing Red as "a slim and elegant volume" and "a wonderful success" in stimulating new thinking. Nevertheless, he noted that the crucial question of how neural feedback loops actually produce immediate awareness remained "left unresolved". Bill Rowe in The American Journal of Psychology endorsed Humphrey's central claims, noting that multiple readings of the text converted him from scepticism to agreement with the author's views.

Conversely, the philosopher John Searle was highly critical in his review for The New York Review of Books. Searle argued that Humphrey "makes a fundamental error from the beginning" by seeking an equation for consciousness rather than a causal explanation. He concluded that the enterprise "was bound to fail because the equation does not solve the problem; it presupposes that the problem has already been solved".

=== Soul Dust ===
Anthropologist Maurice Bloch described Soul Dust as: "An extraordinary book [...] attempts to explain all the most distinctive things about humans in a few hundred pages [...] According to Humphrey the emergence of human consciousness has forced human beings to reflect philosophically and artistically on the meaning of their lives and of the soul [...] Prepare to be infuriated but read the book all the same." Keith Frankish in the Philosophical Quarterly wrote: "[The book] may change your mind about consciousness; it has changed mine". Michael Proulx in Science concluded Humphrey had "laid out a new agenda for consciousness research". However, the philosopher Galen Strawson called its central contentions "hopeless". Mary Midgley, too was sceptical.

=== Sentience ===
Several critics have attacked Sentience for arguing that phenomenal consciousness is a relatively recent evolutionary innovation, possibly limited to warm-blooded animals, both for its scientific arguments and its implications for animal welfare. While acknowledging “Nicholas Humphrey is a fine thinker and a lucid writer”, Alex Gomez-Marin, was dismissive: "Humphrey's 'ipsundrum' is consciousness conundrum's murmdrum's humdrum". By contrast, two evolutionary psychiatrists have described the book as “a welcome scientific antidote to the rampant spate of panpsychist and neo-dualist models and theories that have pervaded the field of consciousness studies in the past couple of decades".

== Personal life ==
Humphrey married his first wife, Caroline Humphrey, in 1967; they divorced in 1977.

He married Ayla Kohn in 1994; they have two children.

He is a Bye Fellow of Darwin College, and an emeritus professor at the London School of Economics.

Humphrey is an atheist and is credited with suggesting to Richard Dawkins the analogy between religion and viruses, contributing to the development of the idea of religious beliefs as "mind viruses" or harmful memes.

In 2016 National Life Stories conducted an oral history interview (C1672/21) with Humphrey for its Science and Religion collection held by the British Library.

== Awards and honours ==
- Glaxo Science Writers Prize (1980)
- Martin Luther King Memorial Prize (1984)
- British Psychological Society Book of Award (1993)
- Pufendorf Medal (2011)
- Mind and Brain Prize (2015)
- Dennett Prize (2026)

== Books ==
- In a Dark Time (1986, Harvard University Press, ISBN 978-0192860521)
- Leaps of Faith (1996, Basic Books, ISBN 978-0571133628), co-authored with Jan Robert
- A History of the Mind: Evolution and the Birth of Consciousness (1999, Copernicus, ISBN 978-0387987194)
- The Inner Eye: Social Intelligence in Evolution (2002, Oxford University Press, ISBN 978-0192802446)
- The Mind Made Flesh (2002, Oxford University Press, ISBN 978-0192802279)
- Seeing Red: A Study in Consciousness (2006, Harvard University Press, ISBN 978-0674030541)
- Soul Dust: The Magic of Consciousness (2012, Princeton University Press, Quercus, ISBN 978-0691156378)
- Sentience: The Invention of Consciousness (2024, MIT Press, ISBN 978-0262047944)
