= Morris Bishop =

American scholar, historian, writer (1893–1973)

Bishop in 1954

Morris Gilbert Bishop (April 15, 1893 – November 20, 1973) was an American scholar who wrote numerous books on Romance history, literature, and biography. His work extended to North American exploration and covered Pascal, Petrarch, Ronsard, La Rochefoucauld, Cabeza de Vaca, and Champlain—embracing literature in Italian, Spanish, Latin, and particularly French. He also worked as a translator and anthologist. Bishop was concerned that his books should be lively and engaging yet be soundly based on fact; they were widely praised for achieving these goals, but were sometimes criticized for falling short.

Orphaned at 12, he was brought up in New York state and Ontario, wrote and published precociously, and entered Cornell University in 1910. Other than from 1914 to 1921 and 1942 to 1945, Bishop remained at Cornell for his entire working life and into retirement, at the age of 77 even fending off a demonstrator with a ceremonial mace.

Bishop was a prolific contributor of light verse and short prose pieces to the popular magazines of the day. His light verse was praised by fellow poets such as Richard Armour, David McCord, and Louis Untermeyer.

== Early life and education ==
At the time of Morris Bishop's birth his father, Edwin Rubergall Bishop, a Canadian physician, was working at Willard Asylum for the Chronic Insane in Willard, New York; Morris was actually born in the hospital. (Note: Charlotte Putnam Reppert writes: "Morris Gilbert Bishop always took wry amusement in the fact that he was born in an institution for the insane.") His mother, Bessie E. Gilbert, died two years later, and Morris and his elder brother Edwin were sent to live with their Canadian grandparents in Brantford, Ontario. His father remarried, and while he was working in Geneva, New York, the boys were sent to live with father and stepmother. Morris was then aged eight. Both his father and stepmother died (from tuberculosis) by the time he was 11, so the brothers were sent to live with their mother's family in Yonkers, New York. Bishop began to write while very young: his earliest known publication was in St. Nicholas, when he was 10. (Note: "A family tradition", St. Nicholas, June 1904, p. 756. (The title had been prescribed by the publisher; see the March 1904 issue, p. 475.) Bishop was awarded the St. Nicholas League silver badge. St. Nicholas at the HathiTrust Digital Library.) He graduated from Yonkers High School in 1910.

Bishop attended Cornell University from 1910 to 1913, earning an A.B. degree, and also Cornell's Morrison Poetry Prize in 1913 (for a poem Bishop later called "hellishly serious") and an A.M. degree in 1914. (Note: The Master's thesis was on the poetry of José-Maria de Heredia.) After that he sold textbooks for Ginn & Co, joined the US Cavalry (and unhappily served under Pershing in the "punitive expedition" in Mexico), was a first lieutenant in the US Infantry in World War I and a member of the American Relief Administration mission to Finland in 1919, and worked as a copywriter in a New York advertising agency, the Harry Porter Company, for a year. He returned to Cornell to begin teaching French and Italian in 1921 and to earn a PhD in 1926; his thesis was on the plays of Jules Lemaître. (Note: Bishop criticized PhD theses for their lack of interest to anyone (even their own writers). "As an example of serious trivia, Bishop offered his own Ph.D. thesis, a 365-page treatise on the forgotten plays of 19th century French Critic-Playwright-Poet Jules Lemaitre. 'I have often thought of extracting it from the library and burning it', he said, 'but I renounced that purpose on realizing that no one has looked at it in 38 years'." "Books for burning", Time, 8 January 1965, p. 47. Via EBSCO.) He was associated with Cornell for the whole of his adult life—not only as an alumnus but as an academic (he was named Kappa Alpha Professor of Romance Literature in 1938) and University historian.

== Career ==
Bishop worked for the US Office of War Information in New York and London from 1942 to 1944, and with the SHAEF Psychological Warfare Division from 1944 to 1945. (Note: A summary of Bishop's responsibilities during this period appears atop: Morris Bishop, "Propaganda—1945", Cornell Alumni News, vol. 47, no. 24 (15 June 1945), p. 502. See also C. Michael Curtis, "Faculty 10: Morris Bishop: The versatile belle-lettrist", Cornell Alumni News, September 1962, pp. 16–19.) Bishop returned to Cornell after the war. He wrote A History of Cornell, its standard history, in 1962. That year he was presented with a festschrift, Studies in Seventeenth-Century French Literature, (Note: Jean-Jacques Demorest, ed, Studies in Seventeenth-Century French Literature, Presented to Morris Bishop (Ithaca, New York: Cornell University Press, 1962). OCLC 558222378.) described in a review as questioning the notion of the "baroque" but showing "a continuing vitality" in its study.

Bishop was a visiting professor at the University of Athens (with a Fulbright teaching fellowship) in 1951, at Wells College from 1962 to 1963, and at Rice University in spring 1966. In 1964, he was president of the Modern Language Association.

After retirement from Cornell in 1960, Bishop served as its marshal, officiating at graduations. During the 1970 ceremony (when he was 77), he used the university mace to fend off a graduate who was trying to seize the microphone. "The jab was given in typical Bishop style: with spontaneity, grace and effectiveness," commented the president, Dale R. Corson. (Note: The story was syndicated by AP and widely reproduced by regional US newspapers, some of whose versions included comments from Bishop on how he had merely used the mace for its original, medieval purpose; a description of the 14-pound (6 kg), four-foot (1.2 m) long mace; and some stories, as related by Bishop in a talk he had recently given at Cornell, of much more violent disturbances in eastern US colleges during the 19th century. One such article: "Professor, 77, beats back demonstrator with a mace", The Cedar Rapids Gazette, 9 June 1970, p. 44. Via NewspaperArchive. "Professor Bishop remarked afterward that his action was especially appropriate since in earlier centuries a Bishop was not allowed to carry stabbing arms such as daggers, swords, etc., but could wield a mace." Elizabeth Baker Wells, Contributions to Cornell History: Portraits, Memorabilia, Plaques and Artists, revised edition (1984), p. 168. Cornell sources of the time identify the graduate struck by the mace, but his identity is disputed. H. Roger Segelken, "Alumna's 'Ithaca Diaries' recounts transformative times", Ezra Update, 2009. Accessed 18 August 2022.)

=== Writings and scholarship ===
"[Bishop's] scholarly forte was biography": he wrote biographies of Pascal, Petrarch, Ronsard, La Rochefoucauld, Cabeza de Vaca, Champlain, and St. Francis. Bishop was aware that academic biographies made only a minor impact, and instead wrote for a wide readership: speaking to an audience of writers, he suggested that would-be biographers consider writing "biofiction", which "may be more bio than fiction, or more fiction than bio", but either way "is based solidly on fact", though permitting "a good deal of invention, a good deal of decoration".

His Survey of French Literature, first published in 1955, was for many years a standard textbook (revised editions were published in 1965 and, posthumously, in 2005). During the late 1950s and early 1960s his reviews of books on historical topics often appeared in The New York Times. As of 2026, his 1968 history of the Middle Ages is still in print. He was a frequent contributor of historical articles to American Heritage and also wrote a miscellany of lighter material, including the pseudonymous comic mystery The Widening Stain and humorous verse and prose pieces published by a variety of magazines. His entry in American National Biography reads:

Bishop's more than 400 publications are noteworthy not only by reason of their volume and their varied subject matter but also because of their charming style and formidable erudition. Bishop was fluent in German, French, Spanish, Swedish, modern Greek, and Latin; his command of the entire breadth of literature in the romance languages was exceptional. His scrupulous accuracy and keen insight gave substance not only to his core studies, those dealing with French language and civilization, but also to those in areas with which he was less familiar. (Note: A profile of Bishop, perhaps based on interviews with him, has a more modest description of his language abilities: "He speaks fluent German, French, and Italian; can 'get by' in Spanish and Swedish; and has only a little difficulty with Latin and Greek.")

On working in those areas of relative unfamiliarity, Bishop said:

I get bored by doing the same thing over. No, it's not a question of being the "well-rounded" man, but I simply wish to satisfy my curiosity about one thing and then go on to another.

Bishop's papers are held at Cornell University Library's Special Collections.

=== Pascal ===
The review of Bishop's book Pascal: The Life of Genius (1936) in the St. Louis Post-Dispatch called it "the first complete description of Pascal as man and as historical figure to appear in English", and praised it highly, particularly for its lively description of the dispute between the Jesuits and Port-Royal. The New York Times review described it as "a solid, comprehensive and valuable addition to the library" with "a heroic attempt to explain the achievements of Pascal as a scientist, philosopher and theologian", and praised Bishop's enthusiasm in writing about Pascal.

The Romance studies scholar Arthur Livingston admired the book as a literary biography, particularly for the way in which Bishop "follows the motive of the 'child prodigy' through the varied influences of that fact in Pascal's life upon his temperament, his moral outlook and the various episodes of his career"—a viewpoint Livingston thought led to perceptiveness and fairness. But Livingston criticized what he saw as Bishop's unnecessary dalliance with "a rather timid Freudianism". He claimed that Pascal evolved "[from] a prig into a charlatan", that his learning is obsolete, and "It is in recovering Pascal the poet and artist from the dross of his biography and his thought that Professor Bishop's criticism is perhaps least effective". Yet Livingston concluded by praising the book as suggestive, comprehensive, and thorough.

The reviewer for Isis found that Bishop "succeeds in painting an objective as well as an enthusiastic picture"; for the reviewer for The Annals of the American Academy of Political and Social Science, "Dr. Bishop has written a scholarly and a brilliantly written book, one which every admirer of Pascal will read with pleasure." The review in Philosophy called the book an "altogether admirable biography", both critical and sympathetic; the reviewer for The Journal of Philosophy thought it should appeal to philosophers as "a well-organized collection of Pascaliana", commenting that "It is unfortunate that [Bishop's] stylistic exuberance sometimes gets the better of him, but for the most part he keeps it under control."

Bishop's Blaise Pascal (a 1966 mass-market paperback) followed a brief description of Pascal's life with a selection of his writings.

Invited to name the outstanding book of the period 1931 to 1961, Bishop named his own Pascal: The Life of Genius, saying that its preparation had taught him much. "There is a useful lesson here: if you want to find out about something of which you know nothing, write a book about it."

=== Petrarch ===
Reviewing Love Rimes of Petrarch (1932), Romeyn Berry enjoyed the opportunity Petrarch gave Bishop to write lyrical poetry: though unable to read the Italian, Berry thought it "safe to assume that in such a satisfying bit of metrical translation there must be much of both [Petrarch and Bishop]".

The review in Saturday Review of Literature of Petrarch and His World (1963) said that "Bishop's sometimes iconoclastic approach distinguishes his magnificent new biography of Petrarch from the hero-worshipping books about the poet". The review in Italica praised the book both as "a scholarly work cleverly concealed behind a sophisticated, witty, and often ironic prose", and for providing "a complete picture of Petrarch's long life, the many aspects of his character, and a scholarly analysis of the wide range of his writings". That in The Historian noted that half of the book was derived from a series of lectures ("the Patten Lectures at Indiana University during the Spring of 1962"), resulting in a style more conversational than normally expected: in general a plus, but occasionally to jarring effect. The Shakespeare scholar M. C. Bradbrook found the biography "engaging". The reviewer for the Canadian Journal of History described the book as "a gracefully written, very readable biography". In places its inferences are debatable, he added, but "some of Bishop's judgements are devastatingly perceptive". He concluded, "In Bishop's hands, Petrarch should come alive for all readers." The review in Renaissance News praised Bishop for "[having] managed to find a human being at the heart of [the superabundance of Petrarch's life] and to treat him kindly as well as sanely", and praised the book for its informativeness and interest and the gracefulness of its translations. The New York Times' regular book reviewer Orville Prescott described the book as "scholarly and yet lively" with "many smoothly flowing translations", yet suggested that it might be found too long to be read cover to cover. The reviewer for Speculum conceded that the book had some brilliant ingredients but compared it unfavourably with one by the Petrarch specialist Ernest H. Wilkins, (Note: The reviewer does not specify the book. Wilkins published a number about Petrarch; perhaps this is his Life of Petrarch (1961; OCLC 901059242).) which was more painstaking, "equally vivid and even more so", and "emerges with something solid"; whereas Bishop failed to provide a coherent picture of Petrarch or even to give the impression that he possessed one.

Bishop translated Petrarch's letters (selected from both the Familiares and the Seniles, and elsewhere) from Latin for Letters from Petrarch (1966). Mark Musa, a scholar of Italian literature, thought it an "elegant" translation—one that "captured the spirit and tone of the poet's Latin letters". The review for Renaissance Quarterly, whose author estimated that the content represented "about one tenth" of Petrarch's surviving letters, started:

This is a book for students of comparative literature who do not read Latin (if there are any). It is also for the undergraduate member of Renaissance literature or Renaissance history courses. It is most definitely for the general reader, who will probably not read it.

The review continued by saying that Bishop's book complemented James Harvey Robinson and Henry Winchester Rolfe's Petrarch the First Modern Scholar and Man of Letters (1898), the latter remaining "most valuable" despite its stilted translations. The review for The Modern Language Journal (MLJ) regretted abridgements and liberties with the translations, but concluded by praising the book as "a worthy effort to bring material not easily accessible to the attention of the cultured laymen for whom it is intended. The translation is eminently readable and is distinguished by the elegance which we have come to expect of Professor Bishop. . . ." The reviews in both the Renaissance Quarterly and MLJ noted that the letters seemed to have been selected to fit Bishop's interests, or those of the educated lay reader, rather than to represent a more rounded picture of Petrarch's concerns.

=== Ronsard ===
In a review of Bishop's Ronsard: Prince of Poets (1940), the French literature scholar Justin O'Brien pointed out that this book—a combination of a biography and critical study of Ronsard and a collection of translations—"is not . . . for specialists. It is written rather for you and me." O'Brien particularly praised Bishop's verse translations of "all of the ten or a dozen deathless lyrics on which Ronsard's fame principally rests, and many other poems as well". He noted how Bishop made Ronsard not just a historical figure but a poet for the mid-20th century.

A second French literature scholar, H. W. Lawton, wrote that Bishop "has succeeded . . . in enlivening and making real the successive stages of Ronsard's development. As a work of literary criticism, the book is less satisfactory. . . ." He concluded that the book "may help some beginner to look on the right side of Ronsard's poetry and serve as an antidote to too much dead-handed analysis".

The reviewer for Thought found the biography one-sided and the book unscholarly as a whole, but had high praise for the translations. The reviewer for Modern Language Notes found various points on which to disagree with Bishop, but nevertheless concluded that this "work of vulgarization" was "an entertaining and useful book".

=== La Rochefoucauld ===
In a review of Bishop's 1951 book The Life and Adventures of La Rochefoucauld, the literary critic F. W. Dupee held that La Rochefoucauld's Maxims are "the essentially impersonal product of a definite method", [which Louis Kronenberger] 'defined as a scientific cynicism . . . which tested vanity in a test-tube'"—and that Bishop, who had little regard for the maxims, misunderstood them. But Dupee nevertheless praised the "engaging detail" of the book, and particularly its portrayal of La Rochefoucauld's final years.

Two other reviewers praised the book for the inferences it draws from the maxims.

=== A Survey of French Literature ===
Bishop's two-volume anthology of French texts, A Survey of French Literature (1955), was praised in The French Review for its selection and for the short piece Bishop writes about each author, in which he "displays a great gift for getting at essentials . . . His comments are invariably apt [and designed] as suggestions or challenges" for the student reader.

The 1965 revised edition made changes to the selections and slightly augmented the annotations. Despite quibbles with certain points, the reviewer for The Modern Language Journal wrote that it had recently had only one significant rival and that the newly revised work was "the anthology in my opinion".

The third edition (2005–2006), revised by Kenneth T. Rivers and in five volumes, again changed the selections and increased the annotations. A review of the new volume on the 18th century found Bishop's original critical commentary "precise, concise, and lively", though in some places old-fashioned.

=== Molière ===
Bishop's 1950 translation of Molière's play The Would-Be Invalid was later staged. A reviewer of a performance in 2003 found the text "an odd combination of overly earnest speeches and jangling contemporary references".

Eight Plays by Molière in Bishop's translation—The Precious Damsels, The School for Wives, The Critique of The School for Wives, The Versailles Impromptu, Tartuffe, The Misanthrope, The Physician in Spite of Himself, The Would-Be Gentleman—appeared as a volume of the Modern Library in 1957. The reviewer for The French Review found the translations of Molière "brilliant", and praised Bishop's short introduction to each play. The reviewer for The Modern Language Journal found "infrequent disappointments" with Bishop's translations, but supposed that the book would be "genuinely useful". (Note: For a comparison of Bishop's and eleven other 20th-century translations of Tartuffe into English, see Nancy Senior, "Translators' choices in Tartuffe", TTR 14 (2001), pp. 39–64. doi:10.7202/000528ar.)

Before Bishop's translations of Molière into English, those most commonly used had been the "really bad" Modern Library selection by Henri van Laun, who according to the French literature scholar Donald Frame "had a genuine talent for dullness". Together with the poet Richard Wilbur's rhymed translation of Misanthrope, Bishop's nine unrhymed translations appeared to Frame, on their publication in the 1950s, as great improvements. But Frame, who would later translate Molière himself, preferred rhyme for translating Molière, and Wilbur's translation to Bishop's, and was "puzzled that Morris Bishop, a connoisseur of Molière and superb comic poet (Spilt Milk, 'Ozymandias Revisited'), did not put him into rhyme".

=== Storybooks ===
From 1970 to 1971 Bishop published a series of four "storybooks" (each illustrated with line drawings by his wife, Alison Mason Kingsbury). A Classical Storybook offered stories in lively English translation (often Bishop's own) from Greek and Latin. A review in Greece & Rome said: "Certainly it is not elementary . . . (although children will read it with avidity)." A review in The Classical Outlook praised the variety of the content and the vividness of the picture it provided.

A review in The American Scholar had high praise for A Medieval Storybook: "[T]he tales share that glorious sense of improbability that is the very essence of a good storybook"; and "The only possible basis for selection of stories for a collection of this sort is the personal taste of the author, and Mr. Bishop's choice is splendid." But the claims on the jacket that the stories "vary widely in theme and their characters represent every class of medieval society . . . [and that] Mr. Bishop's tales vividly illustrate medieval life and thought" struck the reviewer as "quite unjustified, as Mr. Bishop knows very well". The reviewer regretted both the lack of an effort to avoid misinterpretation and Bishop's use of "Wardour-Street English".

Much of A Renaissance Storybook consisted of translations by Bishop from the Italian. A Romantic Storybook has been called "a delightful collection".

=== Other literary studies ===
Bishop's 1929 edition of Voltaire's Candide and Other Philosophical Tales presented Candide, Le Monde comme il va, L'Histoire d'un bon bramin, and L'Ingénu with a small amount of commentary and notes. A reviewer of the 1957 edition (reissued in 1962) found that the editor's introduction and notes were "enlightening and lively".

The review in The Modern Language Journal of Bishop's edition (1933) of Casanova's L'Évasion des Plombs first reassured readers that the book "would pass the most puritanical censorship". It praised "this virile escapade", while pointing out that, even with Bishop's footnotes, the book was for the experienced reader of French.

"Le Roman de vrai amour" and "Le Pleur de sainte âme" (1958), edited by Bishop's student Arthur S. Bates, presents a pair of poems, known only from a manuscript Bishop had discovered twenty years earlier in Cornell University library, (Note: For the discovery, see "Find rare manuscript", Cornell Alumni News, vol. 41, no. 29 (18 May 1939), p. 380. See this entry for the manuscript at Les Archives de littérature du Moyen Âge (ARLIMA).) of "late medieval devotional verse in monorimed alexandrine quatrains [that] possess the absurd but delicate charm of decadent piety". In one chapter Bishop "undertakes the unlikely task of finding sources and analogues for the content of the poems in the literary and mystical currents of the Middle Ages". The reviewer for The Modern Language Review found the chapter "interesting".

Of Bishop's posthumously published Saint Francis of Assisi, the anonymous reviewer for Kirkus Reviews wrote that:

It is not the saint that interests him but the paradoxical and eminently human man. Bishop suggests that much of Francis' celebrated asceticism derived less from his piety than from his irrepressible sense of theatrics. . . . Not the last word in scholarship, this is nonetheless a psychologically convincing portrait . . . . endearing and empathetic.

A much later survey of the American reception of Francis of Assisi judged that "the book is derivative and generally undistinguished".

Bishop also published articles on other writers: as examples, Chateaubriand and Dante At the time of his death, he was working on a biography of Cola di Rienzo.

=== Cabeza de Vaca ===
The earliest of Bishop's biographies was The Odyssey of Cabeza de Vaca (1933). This book on the Spanish explorer was praised in North American Review. The review in The New York Times concluded: "Despite an overwhelming mass of detail and despite the fact that most of his characters are unknown to the general reader, [Bishop] has made de Vaca live; and one feels admiration and indignation, as though the issues involved were things of yesterday."

Comparing the book with John Eoghan Kelly's Pedro de Alvarado Conquistator, the poet Theodore Maynard wrote that "[Bishop's] style is not distinguished, but is at least vivacious", praising the book as entertaining but regretting that Bishop "indulges his propensity for fanciful speculation". The reviewer for The Journal of Modern History found it a "highly entertaining and instructive narrative". The reviews in both The Hispanic American Historical Review and The Journal of Negro History pointed out various problems; yet the former concluded that the book was largely accurate as well as "delightfully written", and the latter that the book was "a brilliant piece of historical research".

Just six years after publication of his book, Bishop himself acknowledged the superiority of a newly published alternative, writing that Cleve Hallenbeck "has produced the best informed and best argued study of Cabeza de Vaca's route that has ever been made".

More recently Bishop's book has been criticized. The authors of a larger biography of de Vaca published in 1999 give their predecessors, and particularly Bishop and Enrique Pupo-Walker, "low marks for shoddy research and implausible or plainly erroneous readings and interpretations". A 2013 paper describes Bishop's book as "a breezy narrative about Cabeza de Vaca, spiced with imaginary dialogue"; saying that it "made no attempt to advance a new route interpretation. Instead, Bishop accepted the conclusions of [Harbert] Davenport and [Joseph K.] Wells set forth some fourteen years earlier".

=== Canada ===
The archaeologist Arthur C. Parker praised Bishop's 1948 biography of the French explorer Samuel de Champlain, Champlain: The Life of Fortitude, as "a good and straightforward account of a mighty hero [that is nevertheless] as exciting as a bit of romance literature", and for making Champlain understandable without running to excessive length. In The New York Times, the book was praised highly both by Orville Prescott ("lively and scholarly", "excellent") and by John A. Krout ("Mr. Bishop's spirited imagination evokes from the record a man whose motives are understandable and whose character shines through both failure and success"). The economic historian Irene Spry wrote that although Bishop told Champlain's tale "in a sometimes jarringly skittish style [the book] is based on a serious study of first-hand sources and is full both of human and geographic interest". The review in Queen's Quarterly started by saying that the book "might equally well have been entitled Champlain Taken Down off His Monument and Made Human"; regretting that Canadian historians approached figures such as Champlain with humility, even servility; whereas Bishop was able to do so with "good-humoured intimacy"—the result was a "charming book". Though faulting the book for fabricated conversations and minor errors, the historian E.R. Adair praised it as providing "constant interest and pleasure". The historian Milo M. Quaife also criticized Bishop's exercise of his imagination, but nevertheless said that the book "will be a worthy and entertaining addition to the bookshelf of anyone who cares to read about the American past". The review in The American Historical Review described it as an "unpretentious but thoroughly informed and judicious book"; the psychologist Elsie Murray called it "a rare blend of psychological acumen and careful scholarship". The historian Grace Lee Nute was much less appreciative: "[N]o one should be misled into believing that this is a scholarly or definitive life of the great explorer, or that it adds anything of note to our knowledge of Champlain's life and achievements." She also found its written style monotonous.

Bishop's White Men Came to the St. Lawrence (1961) earned a dismissive mention in a survey of the literature of colonialism that classed it with Les Canadiens d'autrefois of Robert de Roquebrune as likely to appeal to the general public and schoolchildren. However, the novelist Robertson Davies greatly enjoyed the book "[a]s an introduction to the history of exploration in Canada", writing that he wished he had been present at Bishop's lectures on which it was based.

=== The Book of the Middle Ages ===
Bishop's The Horizon Book of the Middle Ages takes its title from its American publisher's lavish periodical Horizon. The book was published in 1968 to complement The Horizon Book of Great Cathedrals (edited by Jay Jacobs), the pair constituting The Horizon History of the Medieval World. Bishop's volume was "a work of impeccable scholarship and sprightly of style".

The Horizon Book of the Middle Ages spans a millennium, from the 5th to the 16th century. "The narrative focuses on the minutiae of everyday living", and a reviewer judged that, together with the volume on cathedrals, the book would be "richly rewarding" both for those with specialist backgrounds and for "anybody with an inquiring mind".

The book was later republished as The Middle Ages, The Penguin Book of the Middle Ages, and The Pelican Book of the Middle Ages.

=== A History of Cornell ===
Before the publication in 1962 of Bishop's A History of Cornell, the university had just two histories: Cornell University: Founders and the Founding (1943), a highly regarded account by Carl Becker of the period before the arrival of its first students; and Waterman Thomas Hewett's plodding Cornell University: A History (1905). (Note: Curtis elaborates: "[Hewett's] four-volume opus consists in large part of detailed and somewhat turgid recitation, of names, dates, committees, inscriptions, salaries and some of the worst poetry (not Hewett's) ever written in the English language.") Cornell's president, Deane Malott, named Bishop the second University Historian (after Becker) and relieved him of teaching duties for a year so he could produce a history in time for the university's centenary. Bishop completed the research for and writing of the two-volume work A History of Cornell (1962) within three or four months.

Frederick Rudolph's review of the work started: "Seldom in the writing of college and university history have responsible scholarship, felicitous writing, and the warmth and wisdom that come from knowing one's subject been so happily combined"; it continued with similarly glowing commentary. A review in The Journal of Higher Education said that: "Although written in a style to interest the general reader, the concentration inward—on the physical and educational development of the University, omitting any extended treatment of the larger social and academic context—makes it a book primarily for Cornellians." The writer regretted this, but observed that the hundredth anniversaries of a number of the land-grant universities would soon arrive and might prompt a number of similar, single-institution histories, on the bases of which more general histories could be written.

History of Education Quarterly's reviewer had high praise for Bishop's portrayal of the founders, Ezra Cornell and Andrew D. White, and indeed for the book as a whole, not least for its "substantial sketches of the wider social, intellectual, and cultural contexts within which [the university's] leaders dreamed and worked". The review in the Washington, D.C. Evening Star found the history an unusually absorbing example of its genre, thanks to the distinctiveness of both the university and the author. "Prof. Bishop's sonorous almost victorian style is vividly evocative. . . . [His] account is more than even the most captious reader could ask."

The first part of the work was reissued in 1967 as Early Cornell, 1865–1900. It was reviewed in British Journal of Educational Studies together with Becker's Cornell University: Founders and the Founding. The reviewer wrote that Becker's work was more likely to appeal to the general reader—Bishop's book being "more reverent"—but that both constituted "a fitting tribute to a prestige institution".

A History of Cornell retained its high reputation decades after it was published.

=== Light verse ===
Bishop had high regard for light verse:

The aim of poetry, or Heavy Verse, is to seek understanding in forms of beauty. The aim of light verse is to promote misunderstanding in beauty's cast-off clothes. But even misunderstanding is a kind of understanding; it is an analysis, an observation of truth, which sneaks around truth from the rear, which uncovers the lath and plaster of beauty's hinder parts.

Bishop's obituary in The New York Times describes him as "an extraordinarily gifted writer" of light verse, publishing "about fifteen poems and casuals a year in the New Yorker" over a period of more than thirty years. (Note: Casual: "an essay written in a familiar, often humorous style" ("Casual: literature", Encyclopædia Britannica). The website of The New Yorker provides an index of Bishop's contributions.) Bishop also published verse in The Saturday Evening Post, Archaeology, Poetry, The Colonnade, The Measure, The Smart Set, Judge, Saturday Review of Literature and the pre-Luce Life.

After noting how light verse had almost completely vanished from the magazines that had previously published it, David McCord (himself an exponent) wrote:

But from the twenties on down into the fifties there was Morris Bishop, the one true poet at heart who moved with almost elfin grace amid, yet superior to, the difficulties of an art traditionally chained and fettered by strict rhyme and meter.

Writing in 1960, Richard Armour put Bishop together with F.P.A., Margaret Fishback, Arthur Guiterman, Samuel Hoffenstein, Ethel Jacobson, David McCord, Phyllis McGinley, Ogden Nash, Dorothy Parker, E.B. White, and John Updike as "the old (and middle-aged) masters of light verse" that a would-be writer of light verse should study.

==== Five poems ====
"How to Treat Elves", (Note: Paramount Poems, pp. 3–4. The Best of Bishop, pp. 43–44.) a widely anthologized poem, describes a conversation with "The wee-est little elf". The elf tells the narrator "'I dance 'n fwolic about . . . 'n scuttle about and play.'" In four stanzas he describes himself surprising butterflies, "fwightening" Mister Mole by jumping out and saying "Boo", swinging on cobwebs, and so forth. To his question "what do you think of that?", the narrator replies:

"It gives me sharp and shooting pains
To listen to such drool."
I lifted up my foot and squashed
The God damn little fool.

Alison Lurie calls the poem "a brilliant counterattack" against "a particularly cloying sort of supernatural whimsy" that was fashionable in the early 20th century.

Taking up the poet R. C. Trevelyan's challenge (in Thamyris, or Is There a Future for Poetry?) to write on a modern subject "and dispute Virgil's supremacy in this field", Bishop produced "Gas and Hot Air". (Note: Paramount Poems, pp. 38–39. The Best of Bishop, pp. 149–150. Also, William Harmon, ed., The Oxford Book of American Light Verse (New York: Oxford University Press, 1979), p. 367. ISBN 0-19-502509-1.) It describes the operation of a car engine; "Vacuum pulls me; and I come! I come!" cries the gasoline, which reaches

[T]he secret bridal chamber where
The earth-born gas first comes to kiss its bride,
The heaven-born and yet inviolate air
Which is, on this year's models, purified.

"Ozymandias Revisited", (Note: Paramount Poems, p. 85. The Best of Bishop, p. 49.) also widely anthologized, reproduces the first two stanzas of Shelley's poem verbatim, but closes:

And on the pedestal these words appear:
"My name is Ozymandias, king of kings
Look on my works, ye Mighty, and despair!"
Also the names of Emory P. Gray,
Mr. and Mrs. Dukes, and Oscar Baer
Of 17 West 4th St., Oyster Bay.

Bishop's 1950 poem "Song of the Pop-Bottlers", (Note: The New Yorker, 15 April 1950. A Bowl of Bishop, p. 100. The Best of Bishop, p. 141.) again widely anthologized, starts:

Pop bottles pop-bottles
In pop shops;
The pop-bottles Pop bottles
Poor Pop drops.

It is described as among "poems to be said as fast as possible".

One stanza of Bishop's "We Have Been Here Before" (Note: The New Yorker, 29 October 1938, p. 28. The Best of Bishop, p. 39.) reads

I had the same sense of persistence
On the site of the seat of the Sioux;
I heard in the teepee the sound of a sleepy
Pleistocene grunt. It was you.

The poet Louis Untermeyer described the poem as "a fine burlesque of a hundred stereotyped nostalgias".

In his introduction to What Cheer, his own 1945 compendium of "American and British humorous and witty verse", the poet David McCord listed a dozen personal favorites; "We Have Been Here Before" was one. Decades later, McCord praised Bishop's "technical skill" and "perfect ear" as displayed in this poem with those of Thomas Love Peacock as displayed in "The War Song of Dinas Vawr".

==== Paramount Poems ====
Bishop's verse was collected in three volumes during his lifetime: Paramount Poems, Spilt Milk and A Bowl of Bishop. A newspaper review of Paramount Poems (1929, its title page reading "'If it isn't a PARAMOUNT, it isn't a poem.' — Morris Bishop") found it entertaining:

[Bishop's] ear and his taste are vigorous, rough, unsubtle. But he makes up as an entertainer for what he lacks as a poet. . . . He's the protagonist of an audible smile in every poem—preferably in the last line. . . . He's as fresh and wholesome as a crisp fall apple, and—thank God!—the blemish of whimsicality is not upon him.

==== Spilt Milk ====
Stanley Edgar Hyman regarded Bishop's verse in his second collection, Spilt Milk (1942), together with Richard Armour's in Yours for the Asking, as typical of New Yorker light verse: "stock light-verse subjects" adding up to a dated "Light Verse Attitude", all making "an impression of flawless technical competence combined with a fine dose of boredom after reading more than a few poems at a sitting". (Note: Hyman described "most of Ogden Nash . . . and the light verse of such people as Phyllis McGinley and E. B. White" as superior to this humdrum material by Bishop, Armour and others. He added that "The New Yorker's serious verse . . . is surprising for both its quality and its degree of social content.")

Like Hyman, Thomas Sugrue found the subject matter of some of the poems dated. Rather than Bishop's dexterity with classical forms, Sugrue particularly appreciated both the results when Bishop "goes back to his country-boy days", and also his "Rabelaisian wit". (Note: Though Sugrue wrote that "[Richard Armour] is married; Mr. Bishop is not"; at the time, Bishop had been married for over a decade.) Louis Untermeyer took a more favorable view of Spilt Milk. While conceding that "Mr. Bishop is not an originator", he wrote that "he equals and frequently surpasses such contemporary experts in deceptive casualness as F.P.A., Arthur Guiterman, Norman Levy, Phyllis McGinley, and David McCord . . . one seldom encounters a book with so many examples of barbed humor, experienced (not innocent) merriment, and critical nonsense."

==== A Bowl of Bishop ====
Bishop's third verse collection, A Bowl of Bishop: Museum Thoughts and Other Verses (1954) starts with a recipe for a bowlful (for six). There are 18 "Museum Thoughts", each commenting on a work of art (reproduced on the same page). A review in the Buffalo Courier-Express said that in addition to these, the book includes "some 70 other gems of purest, if hardly serene, light verse". The review of the book in The New York Times quoted Bishop on the aim of light verse (see above), and commented: "at that kind of understood misunderstanding, Mr. Bishop is one of the pre-eminentest".

On receiving advance notice from the Dial Press about publication of the book, Harvey Breit, a regular reviewer for The New York Times, was most impressed by "A Critical Appreciation of Morris Bishop" written (tongue in cheek, by Bishop himself) for the book, and wondered: "Is this the jacket copy to end all (non-factual) jacket copy?"

==== The Best of Bishop ====
The Best of Bishop, a posthumous (1980) anthology compiled by Charlotte Putnam Reppert, received a short and dismissive review in the Virginia Quarterly Review, the anonymous reviewer saying that Ogden Nash's poetry was "kinder" than Bishop's, James Thurber's was "droller", and "that of both—better". A much more favorable review by the poet John Ciardi started by remarking on Bishop's adeptness in "The Naughty Preposition" (Note: The New Yorker, 27 September 1947. A Bowl of Bishop, p. 91. The Best of Bishop, p. 35.) (also anthologized). Bishop, he wrote:

is without redeeming social significance, unless one is willing to count precision of language and wit as a grace of civil exchange. Bishop is a master of the tongue.

In Ernest Gowers' style guide The Complete Plain Words (1954), Bishop's poem "The Naughty Preposition" was awarded "championship of the sport of preposition-piling". Like other writers, the linguist D. Gary Miller points out that the poem was "written in response to the nonsensical dictum against ending a sentence with a preposition"; but he adds that the degree of preposition-piling (seven consecutive prepositions) in its last line exemplifies "the creativity that makes art out of the ordinary".

David McCord praised "The Naughty Preposition" as "tops" of poems exhibiting a particular skill of Bishop's: "a couple of seamless quatrains producing the effect of nonsense simply by an unexpected grouping of ordinary words, or by the threading of a string of them like beads in some unusual way".

==== Limericks ====
His obituary in The New York Times called Bishop an "authority" on limericks, and a very facile composer of them; Richard Armour wrote that he was "the only writer of light verse who has had any marked success with them in recent years". He wrote them prolifically: 29 appear in Spilt Milk, 28 in The Best of Bishop, and several even in his pseudonymous novel The Widening Stain (see below). The literary scholar William S. Baring-Gould wrote that Bishop was "one of the great masters of the contemporary limerick". Louis Untermeyer wrote that Bishop "has achieved the almost impossible: he has composed dozens of limericks that are decent but, nevertheless, funny". Similarly, the cultural critic Gershon Legman called him "the unquestionable modern master in the clean limerick line" (and also praised him for "one of the most penetrating articles written 'On the Limerick'" (Note: Legman was referring to Morris Bishop, "Limericks", The New York Times, 3 January 1965, p. BR2. Bishop gives a pithy description of the prosodic and semantic form of the limerick, but devotes much of his article to the limerick's history. Despite praising Bishop as "an authentic scholar and author of superb clean limericks", the author of a later paper on this history questions the Bishop's evidence for an Irish origin, which he dismisses as "another case of the irresponsibility of what passes for limerick scholarship". George N. Belknap, "History of the limerick", The Papers of the Bibliographical Society of America, vol. 75 (1981), pp. 1–32. JSTOR 24302809. (See pp. 10–12.))).

=== The Widening Stain ===
Bishop had a mystery novel, The Widening Stain, published in 1942 under the pseudonym W. Bolingbroke Johnson, rather jokily (Note: According to the dust jacket, he "claims to be a native of Rabbit Hash Landing, Kentucky; a graduate of South Dakota Wesleyan", and so forth. "So he says. / The publisher disclaims responsibility for the truth of all the above statements. . . ." This dust jacket and other materials can be viewed within Curtis Evans, "Down these mean lanes a librarian must go: The Widening Stain (1942), by W. Bolingbroke Johnson", The Passing Tramp (blog), 14 June 2016.) described on the jacket as a former librarian for the American Dairy Goat Association and Okmulgee Agricultural and Mechanical Institute. The novel has been described as "[deriving] both its suspense and its humor . . . from its grotesque mixture of the oil of sex with the water of academic life". Bishop put it together quickly, and when halfway done wrote that "The mystery itself would not deceive an intelligent chimpanzee, but I think I can make it more obscure on second writing." Much of it is set in a university library that, according to his daughter Alison Jolly, borrowed from those of Yale and Cornell. Its sleuth is Gilda Gorham, Chief Cataloger of the library; who according to Bishop's granddaughter Margaretta Jolly appears to be based on his wife, Alison Mason Kingsbury.

The review in The New York Times concluded, "We do not know who W. Bolingbroke Johnson is, but he writes a good story with an academic atmosphere that is not so highly rarefied as we have been led to believe it should be in university circles." A review in The Spectator described the book, and Percival Wilde's novel Tinsley's Bones, as "good American detective stories, and as bright and cheerful as it is possible to be about murder"; however, "there is just something missing [from The Widening Stain] that places the story below the first class". Ralph Partridge congratulated the new novelist for devising a new murder motive, but found the novel uneven and amateurish.

The novel was very quickly attributed to Bishop, (Note: For example, in late 1942 Bishop was described as "author of Paramount Poems and Spilt Milk and, according to report, of The Widening Stain." W. S., Jr, "Bishop's British humor" (review of A Treasury of British Humor), Cornell Alumni News, vol. 45, no. 11 (3 December 1942), p. 139. Book Review Digest for 1942 ascribed not only The Widening Stain but also Spilt Milk and A Treasury of British Humour to "Bishop, Morris Gilbert (W. Bolingbroke Johnson, pseud.)". Book Review Digest: Annual Cumulation 1942 (New York: H. W. Wilson, 1943), pp. 65–66.) who expressed some regret about it, inscribing a copy within Cornell's library:

A cabin in northern Wisconsin
Is what I would be for the nonce in,
To be rid of the pain
Of The Widening Stain
And W. Bolingbroke Johnson.

Bishop started a second mystery but did not complete it.

=== Eccentrics and exotics ===
An enthusiastic review in The New York Times of A Gallery of Eccentrics (1928) (Note: The twelve were: Elagabalus, Brusquet, Jan Baptista van Helmont, Thomas Urquhart, Jeffery Hudson, François-Timoléon de Choisy, Duke Mazarin, Bartholomew Roberts, Bampfylde Moore Carew, Edward Wortley Montagu, jr, Lorenzo Da Ponte, Richard Porson.) summarized by saying that "the author's fastidious sympathy invests [the twelve] with ironic but kindly humanity".

A warm review by Romeyn Berry described the book as revealing "the lives and vivacities of a dozen piquant individuals", all of whom were outclassed by the narrator, himself an invention of Bishop's, an "erudite, irascible don". The review concludes:

Here's a book which, if you break it in tenderly and use it judiciously, will color in your hands like a good pipe and give you solace through many a long night. It's a volume, too, to present to any friend who has a nice discrimination in such matters as tobacco, jade, sound wines, lyric poetry, handsome women, and comfortable books.

The Exotics (1969) profiled 21 more people (Note: The 21 were: James Crichton, La Rochefoucauld, Constant Phaulcon, Thomas Tew, David Bushnell, Margaret Moncrieffe, Denis-Jean Dubouchet, Aquila Giles, Axel Fersen, Deborah Sampson, Parson Weems, Le Clerc Milfort, Louis Philippe I, Moses Smith, Le Père Enfantin, Cinqué, John Humphrey Noyes, Amelia Bloomer, Josiah Warren, Fitz Hugh Ludlow, Frank Holt.) who were unusual in some way. The review in The Boston Sunday Globe said that Bishop "has chosen a magnificent selection of kooks, eccentrics, hard-luck geniuses, or simply romantic figures, . . . and recounted vividly their zany careers"; that in The Indianapolis News said that "It may be that a few of the exotics are merely eccentrics, included to pad out the book, but the over-all effect is informative and pleasing."

The Kirkus review of The Exotics described it as "A pride of little lions—many of them from Revolutionary times—in amiable when not admiring profiles which run about ten pages. . . . Mr. Bishop's style is elderly . . . and given to moralistic ruminations. . . ."

=== Other writing ===
Bishop's youthful experiments included a play produced in 1914 that he later wrote "was the worst play I have ever seen on the stage, and was possibly the worst play ever seen on any stage".

Bishop's anthology A Treasury of British Humor was published in 1942. A review in Queen's Quarterly questioned some of the selections but observed that "here we have an American who not only appreciates British humour, but has a subtle appreciation of it, so subtle an appreciation that we are almost afraid that neither he nor his subtlety will be fully appreciated by less subtle readers. But that will be their fault, not his." Orville Prescott was also surprised by the selection, "only [registering] pained astonishment" when Bishop finds certain works funny. But despite certain regrets, he concluded that "This is a good book, a fat and rich and crisp and juicy book".

Bishop's autobiography was edited by his daughter Alison Jolly as I Think I Have Been Here Before; it "includes poems and the text of many letters written by Bishop, as well as a few illustrations and photographs of Bishop and family". As of 2025, it remains unpublished.

=== Other responsibilities ===
Bishop headed the Usage Panel of the first edition (1969) of The American Heritage Dictionary of the English Language. According to one estimate, among the 105 people making up the panel, Bishop was, together with Calvert Watkins, Mario Pei, and perhaps Morton W. Bloomfield, one of just three or four "who may be described as linguistic specialists". The panel was elderly (average age 64), and predominantly white, male and middle class. One unimpressed scholar wrote that he "would label Bishop's attitude toward the language aristocratic; 'the instinctive verbalizers of the unlettered mass' must be painful for him both linguistically and socially".

Bishop was a Cornell University faculty trustee from 1957 to 1961. Toward the end of his life he worked as the curator of the Olin Library's Fiske Petrarch Collection. Reviewing the catalogue of this collection, the Hispanist Joseph G. Fucilla was disappointed that the library had only half-heartedly acquired newer publications to update the collection started by Willard Fiske .

== Personal life ==
In 1927, Bishop married the artist Alison Mason Kingsbury (1898–1988), who went on to illustrate a number of his books. (They had met at Cornell, where she was working as one of a pair of assistants to the muralist Ezra Winter.) Their daughter, Alison Bishop Jolly (1937–2014), was an expert on lemurs. The family lived at 903 Wyckoff Road, Cayuga Heights.

During the 1940s Vladimir Nabokov's minor renown in the US largely derived from his short stories in Atlantic Monthly. Bishop was a great admirer of these, and on learning in 1947 that Nabokov was teaching at Wellesley College, invited him to apply for the recently vacated Cornell professorship of Russian literature, for which post Bishop chaired the personnel committee. Nabokov, who knew and enjoyed Bishop's verse, charmed the committee, and the Bishops and the Nabokovs "took an immediate instinctive liking to each other". While Nabokov and his wife Véra were at Cornell, "their only close companions" were the Bishops, at whose house they frequently dined. Bishop and Nabokov would exchange limericks by mail. Bishop "remained for the rest of his life a close friend, correspondent, and literary adviser of [Nabokov]".

A 1967 profile described Bishop as "an accomplished belle-lettrist, a distinguished literary biographer, a widely published poet, a bon vivant, raconteur, and teacher-scholar who has served Cornell all of his adult life" and as "one of the charter members of a discreetly exclusive faculty society called 'The Circle', organized by the late Professor George Sabine in the 1920s", and as having been "a long-time member and supporter of Book and Bowl, a considerably less exclusive organization of students and faculty". (Note: On participation in Book and Bowl, see also W. W., "'A Bowl of Bishop' mixes museum thoughts, verse", Buffalo Courier-Express, 28 March 1954, pp. 15‑C, 20‑C. Via Old Fulton NY Post Card Website. Other accounts corroborate "raconteur" and "bon vivant"; for example David I. Grossvogel: "He was the last 'grand old man' of his field. Personally he was good company, a fine raconteur, a bon vivant. . . ." Quoted in Pauline Kerns, "Cornell U. historian, renowned writer, dies", The Ithaca Journal, 21 November 1973, p. 3. Via newspapers.com. Kerns herself is quoted elsewhere as saying that in her work as a reporter "I could never find anyone who didn't like him. Everybody loved him." Tom Cawley, "A scholar with a twinkle and a jab", Press & Sun-Bulletin (Binghamton, New York), 25 November 1973, p. 17. Via newspapers.com.)

Bishop died on 20 November 1973 in Tompkins County Hospital. A service was held for him at Cornell's Sage Chapel.

== Books with major contributions by Bishop ==
- Luigi Lucatelli. Teodoro the Sage. New York: Boni & Liveright, 1923. Translated by Bishop. OCLC 1631739.
- Corrado Ricci. Beatrice Cenci. Two volumes. New York: Boni & Liveright, 1925. OCLC 1909752. London: Heinemann, 1926. OCLC 213529335. Translated by Bishop and Henry Longan Stuart. About Beatrice Cenci.
  - London: Peter Owen, 1956. OCLC 30171665. (Note: This does not appear in Donald D. Eddy's "Morris Bishop: Separate publications".)
- Morris Bishop. A Gallery of Eccentrics; or, A set of twelve originals & extravagants from Elagabalus, the waggish emperor to Mr. Professor Porson, the tippling philologer, designed to serve, by example, for the correction of manners & for the edification of the ingenious. New York: Minton, Balch, 1928. OCLC 927345. Profiles of 12 unusual individuals.
- Morris Bishop. Paramount Poems. New York: Minton, Balch, 1929. Drawings by Alison Mason Kingsbury. OCLC 497477270. Much of the content was reproduced within Spilt Milk (1942). (Note: Spilt Milk dust jacket: "This new collection of verses includes many of the favorites that appeared in Paramount Poems . . . together with a sheaf of new, super-colossal productions. . . .")
- Voltaire. Candide and Other Philosophical Tales. Edited by Bishop. The Modern Student's Library. New York: Scribner's, 1929. OCLC 874327226.
  - New York: Scribner's, 1957. OCLC 830143163.
- Francesco Petrarca. Love Rimes of Petrarch. Ithaca, New York: Dragon Press, 1932. OCLC 1471803. Translated by Bishop, "decorated by Alison Mason Kingsbury". Edition of 500.
  - Westport, Connecticut: Greenwood, 1979. ISBN 0-313-22002-6.
- Giacomo Casanova. L'Évasion des Plombs. New York: Holt, 1933. OCLC 896236. Edited by Bishop.
- Morris Bishop. The Odyssey of Cabeza de Vaca. New York: Century, 1933. OCLC 978223162. About Álvar Núñez Cabeza de Vaca.
  - Westport, Connecticut: Greenwood, 1971. ISBN 0-8371-5739-0.
- Morris Bishop. Pascal: The Life of Genius. New York: Reynal & Hitchcock, 1936. Baltimore: Williams & Wilkins, 1936. London: Bell, 1937. OCLC 3595622. About Blaise Pascal.
  - Westport, Connecticut: Greenwood, 1968. OCLC 317508251.
  - Pascal. Berlin: Die Runde, 1938. OCLC 11799202. German translation by Erika Pfuhl and Richard Blunck.
  - Pascal: la vida del genio. Mexico: Hermes. OCLC 865303398. Spanish translation by Mariano de Alarcón.
- Morris Bishop. Ronsard, Prince of Poets. New York: Oxford University Press, 1940. OCLC 230143477. A critical study with many translations by Bishop.
  - Ann Arbor Paperbacks, 26. Ann Arbor: University of Michigan Press, 1959. OCLC 252022391.
- W. Bolingbroke Johnson. The Widening Stain. New York: Knopf, 1942. A mystery novel, largely set in the library of Cornell University. Johnson was a pseudonym of Bishop's. OCLC 961366. Book jacket design by E. McKnight Kauffer. (Note: The rear of the dust jacket of the 1976 edition says: "This facsimile reproduces as closely as possible the first printing of the first edition, including the original dust jacket drawing by E. McKnight Kauffer.")
  - New York: Grosset & Dunlap, 1942 ("Popular Copyright" edition). OCLC 43367428.
  - London: John Lane, 1943. OCLC 752871434.
  - Ithaca, New York: Cornell University Library Associates, 1976. A facsimile of the 1942 Knopf edition, according to an unnumbered page in the front matter "published by The Cornell University Library Associates for its members and for friends of Cornell University". OCLC 49794607. Acknowledges Bishop's authorship within the copyright page. (Note: "Copyright © renewed 1970 by W. Bolingbroke Johnson (Morris Bishop)"; also on this page, the "Library of Congress Cataloging in Publication Data" states "Bishop, Morris, 1893–1973. / The widening stain, by W. Bolingbroke Johnson [pseud.]. . . .")
  - Boulder, Colorado: Rue Morgue, 2007. ISBN 978-1-60187-008-7. Openly identifies Bishop as the author.
  - American Mystery Classics. S.l.: Penzler, 2020. ISBN 978-1-61316-169-2 (hardback); ISBN 978-1-61316-171-5 (paperback). With an introduction by Nicholas A. Basbanes.
  - La Tache qui s'étend. Police Judiciaire. S.l.: Paix, 1948. Translation into French by G. de Tonnac-Villeneuve. OCLC 41004175.
- Morris Bishop. Spilt Milk. New York: Putnam's, 1942. With illustrations by Alison Mason Kingsbury and Richard Taylor. OCLC 1720854. Reproduces much of Paramount Poems (1929).
- Morris Bishop, ed. A Treasury of British Humor. New York: Coward-McCann, 1942. OCLC 811583710.
  - Freeport, New York: Books for Libraries, 1970. ISBN 0-8369-6194-3.
- Morris Bishop. Champlain: The Life of Fortitude. New York: Knopf, 1948. OCLC 1310945. About Samuel de Champlain.
  - London: McDonald, 1949. OCLC 752964324.
  - Carleton Library, no 4. Toronto: McClelland & Stewart, 1963. OCLC 4179498.
  - New York: Octagon, 1979. OCLC 0374906424.
- Molière. The Would-Be Invalid. Crofts Classics. New York: Appleton-Century-Crofts, 1950. Translated and edited by Bishop. OCLC 723498991.
  - New York: Appleton-Century, 1964. OCLC 30883137.
- Morris Bishop. The Life and Adventures of La Rochefoucauld. Ithaca, New York: Cornell University Press, 1951. OCLC 752621492. About François de La Rochefoucauld.
- Morris Bishop (1954). A Bowl of Bishop: Museum Thoughts and Other Verses. New York: Dial Press. OCLC 492645911 – via Internet Archive..
- Morris Bishop. A Survey of French Literature. 2 vols. Vol 1. The Middle Ages to 1800. Vol 2. The Nineteenth and Twentieth Centuries. New York: Harcourt, Brace and World, 1955. OCLC 881290834.
  - Revised edition. New York: Harcourt, Brace and World, 1965. OCLC 861987098.
  - 3rd edition. 5 vols, by Bishop and Kenneth Troy Rivers. Newburyport, Massachusetts: Focus, 2005–2006. Vol 1. The Middle Ages and the Sixteenth Century. ISBN 978-1-58510-106-1. Vol 2. The Seventeenth Century. ISBN 978-1-58510-107-8. Vol 3. The Eighteenth Century. ISBN 978-1-58510-180-1. Vol 4. The Nineteenth Century. ISBN 978-1-58510-181-8. Vol 5. The Twentieth Century. ISBN 978-1-58510-182-5.
- Molière. Eight plays by Molière: The Precious Damsels; The School for Wives; The Critique of The School for Wives; The Versailles Impromptu; Tartuffe; The Misanthrope; The Physician in Spite of Himself; The Would-Be Gentleman. New York: Modern Library, 1957. OCLC 500665387. Translated and introduced by Bishop.
  - Mattituck, New York: Aeonian, c.1986. ISBN 0-88411-448-1.
- Morris Bishop. Samuel de Champlain: fondateur du Canada, héros national; l'homme, le cher compagnon de nos cœurs. Québec: Festival National Champlain, 1958. OCLC 49065501. About Samuel de Champlain.
- Arthur S. Bates, ed. "Le Roman de vrai amour" and "Le Pleur de sainte âme". University of Michigan Contributions in Modern Philology, 24. Ann Arbor: University of Michigan Press, 1958. An edition of a manuscript in Cornell University rediscovered by Bishop, who contributes pages 24–39. The book is based on Bates's PhD thesis. OCLC 504592005.
  - Ann Arbor: University of Michigan Press, 2016. ISBN 978-0-472-75017-7. doi:10.3998/mpub.9690414.
- Morris Bishop. White Men Came to the St. Lawrence: The French and the Land They Found. Sir Edward Beatty memorial lectures. London: Allen & Unwin, 1961. OCLC 932916784. Montreal: McGill University Press, 1961. OCLC 299945193. (Note: Eddy states that the McGill edition is more carefully proofread.)
- Morris Bishop. A History of Cornell. Ithaca, New York: Cornell University Press, 1962. OCLC 560430806. 1992. ISBN 978-0-8014-0036-0. 2014. ISBN 978-0-8014-5538-4. About Cornell University.
  - Early Cornell, 1865–1900: The First Part of "A History of Cornell". Ithaca, New York: Cornell University Press, 1962. OCLC 220773188.
- Morris Bishop. Petrarch and His World. Bloomington: Indiana University Press, 1963. OCLC 422137205. London: Chatto & Windus, 1964. OCLC 5687293.
  - Port Washington, New York: Kennikat, 1973. ISBN 0-8046-1730-9.
  - Bloomington: Indiana University Press, 2002. ISBN 978-0-253-34122-8
- Francesco Petrarca. Letters from Petrarch. Bloomington: Indiana University Press, 1966. OCLC 504516563. Letters selected and translated by Bishop; drawings by Alison Mason Kingsbury.
- Morris Bishop. Blaise Pascal. Laurel Great Lives and Thought. New York: Dell, 1966. OCLC 577301. About Blaise Pascal.
- Morris Bishop. The Horizon Book of the Middle Ages. New York: American Heritage; distributed Boston: Houghton Mifflin, 1968. Edited by Horizon (editor in charge Norman Kotker). OCLC 272326.
  - The Middle Ages. American Heritage Library. New York: American Heritage, 1970. ISBN 0-07-005466-5.
  - The Penguin Book of the Middle Ages. Harmondsworth, Middlesex: Penguin, 1971. ISBN 0-14-003174-X. Abridged edition.
  - The Pelican Book of the Middle Ages. Harmondsworth, Middlesex: Penguin, 1978. ISBN 0-14-022519-6.
  - The Middle Ages. American Heritage Library. Boston: Houghton Mifflin, 1987. ISBN 0-8281-0487-5.
  - The Middle Ages. Mariner Books. Boston: Houghton Mifflin, 1996. ISBN 0-618-05703-X.
- Morris Bishop. The Exotics: Being a Collection of Unique Personalities and Remarkable Characters. New York: American Heritage, 1969. ISBN 0-8281-0008-X.
- Morris Bishop. A Medieval Storybook. Ithaca, New York: Cornell University Press, 1970. ISBN 0-8014-0562-9. Drawings by Alison Mason Kingsbury.
  - Ithaca, New York: Cornell University Press, 2013. ISBN 978-0-8014-7882-6.
- Morris Bishop. A Classical Storybook. Ithaca, New York: Cornell University Press, 1970. ISBN 0-8014-0577-7. Drawings by Alison Mason Kingsbury.
  - Ithaca, New York: Cornell University Press, 2019. ISBN 978-1-5017-4128-9
- Morris Bishop. A Renaissance Storybook. Ithaca, New York: Cornell University Press, 1971. ISBN 0-8014-0592-0. Drawings by Alison Mason Kingsbury.
  - Ithaca, New York: Cornell University Press, 2019. ISBN 978-1-5017-4129-6
- Morris Bishop. A Romantic Storybook. Ithaca, New York: Cornell University Press, 1971. ISBN 0-8014-0658-7. Drawings by Alison Mason Kingsbury.
- Petrarch: Catalogue of the Petrarch Collection in Cornell University Library. Millwood, New York: Kraus-Thomson, 1974. ISBN 0-527-19700-9. With an introduction by Bishop.
- Morris Bishop. Saint Francis of Assisi. Boston: Little, Brown, 1974. ISBN 0-316-09665-2. About Francis of Assisi.
  - Franciscus: een biografie. Baarn, Utrecht: Amboeken, 1974. ISBN 9026303467. Dutch translation by Henri van der Burght.
- Morris Bishop. The Best of Bishop: Light Verse from "The New Yorker" and Elsewhere. Ithaca, New York: Cornell University Press, 1980. ISBN 0-8014-1310-9. Edited by Charlotte Putnam Reppert; with a foreword by David McCord, an introduction by Reppert, and drawings by Alison Mason Kingsbury and Richard Taylor. (Note: McCord's foreword and Reppert's introduction also appear, as "The arch Bishop" (pp. 29–31) and "The way he said it" (pp. 34–35) respectively, in Cornell Alumni News, vol. 83, no. 4 (November 1980).)
- Morris Bishop. Light Verse in America. Aquila Essays, no 8. Portree, Isle of Skye: Aquila, 1982. ISBN 0-7275-0224-7.

== Awards and honors ==
- Order of the White Rose of Finland, 1919
- Officier d'Académie, France, 1937
- Chevalier de la Légion d'Honneur, France, 1948
- Honorary doctorates: University of Rennes (France), 1948; Union College (US), 1953; Université Laval (Canada), 1954; Hofstra University (US), 1956; Colgate University (US), 1959; Trent University (Canada), 1969
- Golden Rose Award of the New England Poetry Club, 1959
- Honorary citizen of Quebec City, 1954
- Gold medal (posthumous), World Petrarch Congress, April 1974

== Adaptations ==
In 1928 John Barnes Wells published "The silly little fool", a composition for voice and piano accompaniment, using Bishop's "How to Treat Elves". Emanuel Rosenberg adapted Bishop's "The Complete Misanthropist", (Note: The New Yorker, 27 November 1942, p. 22. A Bowl of Bishop, p. 38. The Best of Bishop, p. 137.) publishing it in 1944.

Warren Benson wrote A Song of Joy, for Mixed Voices with words by Bishop, publishing it in 1965. He adapted Bishop's "Song of the Pop-Bottlers" for three-part chorus, "The Naughty Preposition" for mixed chorus, and "An Englishman with an Atlas; or, America the Unpronounceable" (Note: The New Yorker, 10 February 1950, p. 34. A Bowl of Bishop, p. 103.) for mixed chorus.

Ludwig Audrieth and G.L. Coleman adapted Bishop's "Tales of Old Cornell" for the unaccompanied choral work Tales of Old Cornell (published together with Lingering, with words by Albert W. Smith). Edgar Newton Kierulff wrote a play, Moving day in Shakspere's England, "[a]dapted from an original piece by Morris Bishop", and published in 1964 in a small edition for friends.
