= Richard Byrne =

Richard Byrne may refer to:

- Richard Byrne (politician) (died 1942), Irish nationalist politician in Northern Ireland
- Richard William Byrne, British psychologist, neuroscientist, primatologist
- Richie Byrne (born 1981), Irish association footballer
- Richard Byrne, musician in the Canadian folk music band The Halifax Three

== See also ==
- Richard Byrnes (1832–1864), Irish-American officer in the United States Army
