= Seeing Red: A Study in Consciousness =

2006 book by Nicholas Humphrey

- Author: Nicholas Humphrey
- Language: English
- Subject: Consciousness, Philosophy of mind, Evolutionary psychology
- Publisher: Harvard University Press
- Publication date: 2006
- Publication place: United States
- Media type: Print (Hardcover, Paperback)
- ISBN: 978-0-674-03054-1

Seeing Red: A Study in Consciousness is a 2006 book by the psychologist Nicholas Humphrey, published by Harvard University Press. In the book, Humphrey proposes an evolutionary account of consciousness, specifically addressing the "hard problem" of phenomenal experience. He argues that conscious sensations are not passive observations of the world but "privatized" bodily actions—feedback loops that evolved to give organisms a sense of self-worth, thereby enhancing their motivation to survive.

== Background ==
The book is based on the Distinguished Lecture Series sponsored by the Mind, Brain, and Behavior Board, which Humphrey delivered at Harvard University in 2004. The central theory of sensation as an internalized action expands upon ideas Humphrey previously explored in his 1992 book, A History of the Mind.

== Summary ==
Humphrey structures the book around a central case study: the experience of seeing the colour red. He aims to explain how physical neural activity gives rise to the subjective feeling of "what it is like" to experience a sensation.

=== Sensation versus perception ===
A core argument of the book is the distinction between "sensation" and "perception". Humphrey posits that these are two distinct channels that evolved for different purposes.

- Perception is described as an objective, analytical representation of the external world ("what is happening out there"). It is "modality-neutral" and abstract.
- Sensation is described as an evaluative, personal response ("what is happening to me"). Humphrey refers to the sensation of red as "redding"—an active thing the subject does, rather than passively receives.

Humphrey cites the phenomenon of blindsight as evidence for this dissociation. Patients with blindsight claim to be blind (lacking sensation) yet can accurately guess the location or colour of objects (retaining perception). He argues this demonstrates that one can perceive the world without experiencing the accompanying sensation.

=== Evolution of consciousness ===
Humphrey proposes that sensations evolved from primitive bodily actions. In early organisms, a stimulus (such as red light) would trigger a specific physical reaction, such as a wriggle. He argues that over the course of evolution, these overt actions became "privatized". As animals developed the need to monitor their own responses without necessarily acting on them physically, the neural command signals were short-circuited. Instead of reaching the muscles, the signals were routed back internally within the brain in a recursive feedback loop. Humphrey terms this process "sentition".

=== The function of the Self ===
The book addresses the evolutionary function of phenomenal consciousness. Humphrey argues that the "thick," time-extended nature of this internal feedback loop creates a "magical" illusion of a substantial, metaphysical self. He concludes that this is an adaptive trait: by creating a "self worth having"—a sense that one's own consciousness is mysterious and precious—organisms are more motivated to sustain their own lives and the lives of those with whom they empathize.

== Reception ==
The book received a mix of praise and criticism, sparking significant debate in the fields of philosophy of mind and cognitive science.

Writing in the journal Brain, the philosopher Daniel Dennett praised Humphrey as "unique... in his combination of audacity and circumspection." Dennett noted that while Humphrey's methods had made "a large contribution to our understanding of consciousness," he questioned whether the distinction between "redding" and other responses to stimuli was sufficiently clear.

In Artificial Intelligence, Natika Newton called the book "an invaluable contribution to the mind-body debate," describing its approach to selfhood as "straightforward, parsimonious, and intuitively plausible." However, she acknowledged that Humphrey had not fully explained how qualitative differences between specific sensations (e.g., red vs. pain) could be commensurate with differences in bodily responses.

Josh Weisberg, writing in Nature, described Seeing Red as "a slim and elegant volume" and "a wonderful success" in stimulating new thinking. Nevertheless, he noted that the crucial question of how neural feedback loops actually produce immediate awareness remained "left unresolved".

Bill Rowe in The American Journal of Psychology endorsed Humphrey's central claims, noting that multiple readings of the text converted him from scepticism to agreement with the author's views.

Conversely, the philosopher John Searle was highly critical in his review for The New York Review of Books. Searle argued that Humphrey "makes a fundamental error from the beginning" by seeking an equation for consciousness rather than a causal explanation. He concluded that the enterprise "was bound to fail because the equation does not solve the problem; it presupposes that the problem has already been solved".

In 2021, Giorgio Vallortigara discussed the book in an article in Biochemical and Biophysical Research Communications, in the context of the ideas of the Scottish philosopher Thomas Reid, and research by Erich von Holst on efference copies. He argues that the distinction between sensation and perception made by Humphrey can be traced back to the need for organisms to distinguish between self-generated movement and external stimuli.
