= Henry B. Kane =

Henry Bugbee Kane (January 8, 1902, Cambridge, Massachusetts – February 12, 1971, Lincoln, Massachusetts) was an M.I.T. fund director, book illustrator, author of nature books for children, and nature photographer.

== Biography ==
After graduating from Phillips Exeter Academy, he matriculated at Massachusetts Institute of Technology (MIT), where he graduated in 1924. After graduation, he joined the Boston Edison Company as an engineer planning lighting systems for buildings and outdoor areas and then working in the company's advertising and promotion departments. After several years he resigned from Boston Edison and became at MIT an administrative assistant to MIT's president Karl T. Compton. Kane was the director of the MIT alumni fund from 1940 to 1966, when he retired. During his directorship he helped to raise eleven million dollars.

Kane was an outdoor enthusiast and amateur naturalist who wrote and illustrated more than a dozen natural history books for children. Alfred A. Knopf, Inc. published a series of these books.

“The Tale of a Mouse” was his first book, which he wrote after realizing that there was a great lack of “factual stories of native wildlife told in a manner calculated to entertain while they instruct.” His first children’s natural history book was followed by a series of "The Tale of..." books about animals such as a crow, a moth, and a bullfrog, as well as "The Tale of..." habitats such as a wood, a meadow, and a pond.

He gained considerable fame as an illustrator for nature books written by prominent authors, such as Sally Carrighar, David McCord, Wyman Richardson, and John J. Rowlands (who was one of his close friends). Kane contributed about eighty photographs to Thoreau's Walden—A Photographic Register published by A. A. Knopf in 1946. He illustrated five volumes of excerpts, edited by Dudley C. Lunt, from Thoreau's journals; the excerpts were originally published in the 1950s by W. W. Norton & Company.

Mr. Kane illustrated ... John Kieran's “A Natural History of New York City.” Edwin Way Teale, reviewing the Kieran work in 1959 for The New York Times Sunday Book Review, noted: “The drawings, by Henry B. Kane, have the delicate quality of lithographs and beautifully complement the text.”

Upon his death he was survived by his widow, a son, two daughters, and three grandchildren.
