= Machiavellian intelligence hypothesis =

Animal behavior hypothesis

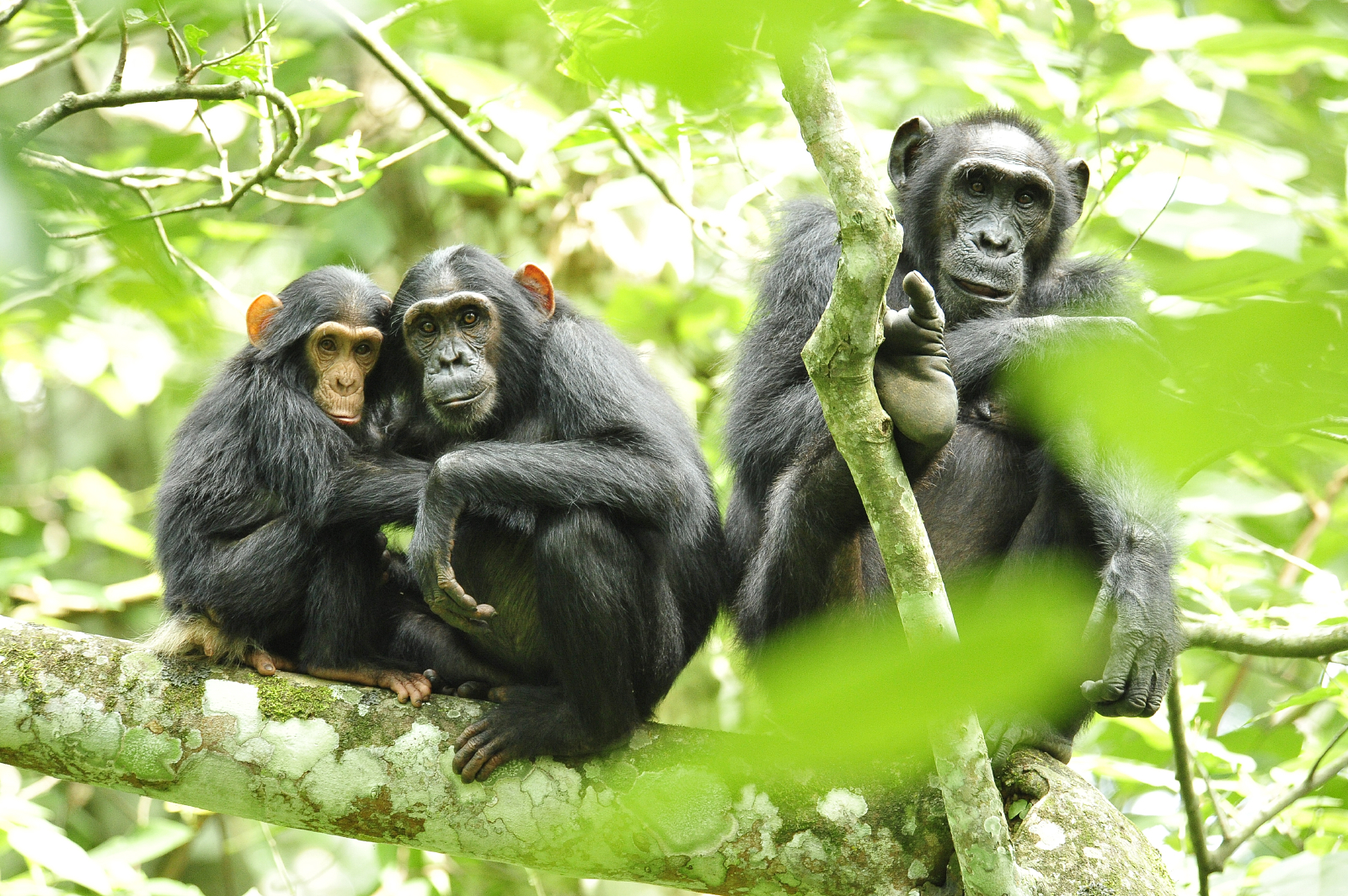
Group of chimpanzees

In primatology, the Machiavellian intelligence or social brain hypothesis describes the capacity of animals to manoeuvre in complex social groups.

This hypothesis posits that the challenges involved in navigating complexity in social groups is a major driving force in the evolution of human intelligence. To succeed within social groups, individuals must strike a balance between cooperation and competition with other diverse individuals, requiring subtle social skills rather than brute power.

== Origin of the term ==
The hypothesis originates from the primatologist Frans de Waal, who discussed chimpanzees' complex social maneuverings in his book Chimpanzee Politics (1982). However, foundations for the hypothesis can be traced to lemur researcher Alison Jolly. While conducting field research in the 1960s, Jolly noticed that lemurs lacked monkeys' ability to manipulate objects but demonstrated similarly strong social skills. At the time, it was commonly believed that solving technical and foraging challenges is what fueled the advancement of primate intelligence. Jolly found that, on the contrary, social skills preceded technical abilities and thus played a more central role.

Andrew Whiten and Richard Byrne advanced this theory further by collecting studies highlighting the role of sociality in intelligence. The first, Machiavellian Intelligence: Social Expertise and the Evolution of Intellect in Monkeys, Apes, and Humans (Oxford University Press, 1988), included Jolly's seminal paper, along with an earlier study by Margaret Mead and an important piece of synthesis by Nicholas Humphrey. A followup volume, Machiavellian Intelligence II: Extensions and Evaluations (Cambridge University Press, 1997), provided updated evidence. Contributors to both volumes observed that primates displayed intricate social behaviors such as alliance formation, deception, and reconciliation. These behaviors seemed to require cognitive abilities beyond what was necessary for basic survival tasks like foraging or avoiding predators.

== Relations with other research ==
As a concept, it is also conflated with, and mistaken for the Machiavellianism personality construct, which focuses on the affective-interpersonal traits of human beings, such as unemotionality and exploitativeness, while Machiavellian Intelligence deals with the social behaviors of primates and is not focused on immoral actions. Akin to the concept in psychology, "Machiavellian intelligence" is a mere borrowing of Machiavelli's name and is in no way related to the thinker himself.

== Primate social behavior ==
In Chimpanzee Politics, de Waal describes the various social behaviors among chimpanzees, focusing specifically on interactions such as coat hair grooming. The first section explains the "submissive greeting," where a more submissive chimpanzee acknowledges a dominant one through pant-grunting, bobbing, or bringing objects like leaves or sticks. Dominant chimps respond by making themselves appear larger, while the submissive one may crouch or present their backside for inspection. Among adult males, dominance can be further exaggerated by actions like stepping over the subordinate, reinforcing social rank through physical gestures.

Another part of the book highlights grooming as the most frequent social activity in the Arnhem colony. Chimpanzees gather in grooming clusters, carefully attending to each other's hair while making soft sounds. This behavior strengthens social bonds and demonstrates their enjoyment of being groomed. Meanwhile, young chimpanzees, especially those slightly older, engage in energetic play, sometimes disrupting grooming groups by running through them or throwing sand, showing the coexistence of structured social order and youthful exuberance within the chimpanzee community.

Chimpanzees try to detect early signs of hostility to avoid conflict. Female aggression is described as sudden and unpredictable, while male aggression builds up gradually through body swaying, raised hackles, increased vocalizations, and ultimately an attack.

== Criticisms ==
Researchers Shirley C. Strum, Deborah Forster and Edwin Hutchins state that "We suggest that Machiavellian intelligence may be a misnomer." and that "primate social complexity appears to be an intricate tapestry of competition and cooperation, of aggression and reconciliation, of nonaggressive social alternatives, and of behaviors and relationships that cannot be easily categorized into simple opposites." Critics also cite that the "exceptions" in the form of small-brained primates in very large groups typically eat abundant but nutrient-poor foods (such as geladas that eat grass), as predicted by the food-based model, and argue that the higher individual need for nutrients put on by large brains causes groups to become smaller if the species have the same degree of digestive specialisation and environmental availability of food.

== See also ==
- Primate cognition
- Primate evolution
- Intelligence
