= A History of the Mind =

1992 book by Nicholas Humphrey

- Cover of the first edition
- Author: Nicholas Humphrey
- Language: English
- Subject: Mind–body problem
- Publisher: Chatto & Windus
- Publication date: 1992
- Publication place: United Kingdom
- Media type: Print (Hardcover and Paperback)
- Pages: 230
- ISBN: 9780671686444
- OCLC: 905469778

A History of the Mind: Evolution and the Birth of Consciousness is a 1992 book about the mind–body problem by the psychologist Nicholas Humphrey. Humphrey advances a hypothesis about consciousness that has been criticised as speculative.

== Summary ==
In A History of the Mind (1992), Nicholas Humphrey uses an evolutionary angle to explain the origin and development of human consciousness. He argues that consciousness, like other mental processes, has undergone a period of evolution.

Humphrey describes his book as "a partial history of a part of what constitutes the human mind: an evolutionary history of how sensory consciousness has come into the world and what it is doing there." He discusses the views of the poet Samuel Taylor Coleridge and the philosophers Colin McGinn and Daniel Dennett, and the phenomenon known as blindsight, in which people who are blind in a large part of the visual field nevertheless retain "certain perceptual faculties" and apparently have "perception without sensation".

== Publication history ==
A History of the Mind was first published by Chatto & Windus in 1992. In 1993, it was published by Vintage Books.

== Reception ==
A History of the Mind received positive reviews from the science journalist Marek Kohn in New Statesman and Society, Francisca Goldsmith in Library Journal, and from Publishers Weekly, mixed reviews from the biologist Lewis Wolpert in New Scientist and the psychologist George Armitage Miller in The New York Times Book Review, and negative reviews from John C. Marshall in The Times Literary Supplement and McGinn in the London Review of Books.

Kohn described the book as "absorbing and stimulating". It referred to Humphrey's style of writing as "personal and informal". Goldsmith wrote that the book would appeal to both "interested lay readers" and scholars. Publishers Weekly described the book as "highly stimulating" and "unorthodox". It credited Humphrey with "Lightening his often technical discussion with thought experiments, drawings and illustrative examples". Wolpert considered the book's title misleading, arguing that its primary subject was consciousness. Though he found the book clever and well-written, he believed that, like similar books by other authors, it failed to "illuminate what consciousness is about."

Miller described the book as "readable and entertaining" and "stimulating", but wrote that it might leave readers wondering why the problem of consciousness had been considered so difficult. He questioned Humphrey's account of blindsight and his treatment of mental imagery, maintaining that its shortcomings undermined his arguments. He compared A History of the Mind to the physicist Stephen Hawking's A Brief History of Time (1988), though he considered it unlikely to enjoy similar success.

Marshall criticised Humphrey's style of writing and wrote that his "account of the evolutionary development of consciousness" was "highly speculative" and so lacking in precision and detail that it was questionable whether it could be considered a theory. He added that Humphrey's comparison of the senses of vision and hearing to those of touch, pain, smell and taste was contradicted by physiological evidence.

McGinn described the book as "bold and speculative", and credited Humphrey with making interesting observations about topics such as the "affective dimensions of colour" and blindsight. Nevertheless, he dismissed his theory of consciousness as a "dismal failure", arguing that explaining consciousness was so difficult as to be impossible. He also believed that Humphrey's theory suffered from a "mixture of obscurity and circularity" and that he failed to "give any account of the representational character of sensory experience."

A History of the Mind received a positive review from The Lancet, which described the book as an "entertaining and well-thought out work" and Humphrey's attempt to "solve the riddle of perception, sensation, and consciousness" as brave. It considered his ideas a possible basis for "a new neurophysiology", but criticised him for misinterpreting Coleridge.

The author Richard Webster called A History of the Mind one of the most interesting attempts to solve the mind–body problem. He suggested that Humphrey succeeded in eliminating mind-body dualism entirely, although he noted that details of Humphrey's hypothesis remain speculative and open to criticism and that the hypothesis was rejected by McGinn. The paleoanthropologist Donald Johanson, writing with Blake Edgar, noted that Humphrey's hypothesis about consciousness places a different emphasis on feeling and thinking than the hypothesis about consciousness put forward by Dennett in Consciousness Explained (1991).
