= Primate cognition =

Study of non-human primate intellect

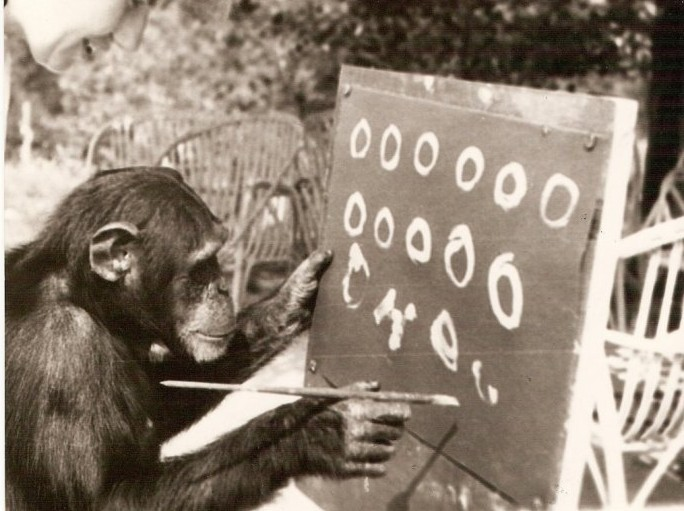
The chimpanzee Böbe painting in 1967

Primate cognition is the study of the intellectual and behavioral skills of non-human primates, particularly in the fields of psychology, behavioral biology, primatology, and anthropology.

Primates are capable of high levels of cognition; some make tools and use them to acquire foods and for social displays; some have sophisticated hunting strategies requiring cooperation, influence and rank; they are status conscious, manipulative and capable of deception; they can recognise kin and conspecifics; they can learn to use symbols and understand aspects of human language including some relational syntax, concepts of number and numerical sequence.

== Studies in primate cognition ==
=== Theory of mind ===
Theory of mind (also known as mental state attribution, mentalizing, or mindreading) can be defined as the "ability to track the unobservable mental states, like desires and beliefs, that guide others' actions". Premack and Woodruff's 1978 article "Does the chimpanzee have a theory of mind?" sparked a contentious issue because of the problem of inferring from animal behavior the existence of thinking, of the existence of a concept of self or self-awareness, or of particular thoughts.

Non-human research still has a major place in this field, however, and is especially useful in illuminating which nonverbal behaviors signify components of theory of mind, and in pointing to possible stepping points in the evolution of what many claim to be a uniquely human aspect of social cognition. While it is difficult to study human-like theory of mind and mental states in species which we do not yet describe as "minded" at all, and about whose potential mental states we have an incomplete understanding, researchers can focus on simpler components of more complex capabilities.

For example, many researchers focus on animals' understanding of intention, gaze, perspective, or knowledge (or rather, what another being has seen). Part of the difficulty in this line of research is that observed phenomena can often be explained as simple stimulus-response learning, since mental states can often be inferred based on observed behavioural cues. Recently, most non-human theory of mind research has focused on monkeys and great apes, who are of most interest in the study of the evolution of human social cognition. Research can be categorized in to three subsections of theory of mind: attribution of intentions, attribution of knowledge (and perception), and attribution of belief.

1. Attribution of intentions. Research on chimpanzees, capuchin monkeys, and Tonkean macaques (Macaca tokeana) has provided evidence that they are sensitive to the goals and intentions of others and are able to differentiate between when an experimenter is unable to give them food versus when the experimenter is just unwilling to.
2. Attribution of knowledge (and perception). Hare et al. (2001) demonstrates that chimpanzees are aware of what other individuals know. They can also understand what another perceives, and they selectively choose food that is not visible to their competitor.
3. Attribution of belief. A false-belief test is a comprehensive test used to test for an individual's theory of mind. Understanding language is a key component to being able to understand the directions for the false-belief test, and researchers have had to get creative to utilize this test in the research of non-human primates' theory of mind. Recent technology has enabled researchers to closely resemble the false-belief task without needing to use language. In Krupenye et al. (2016), an advanced eye-tracking technology was used to test for false-belief understanding in apes. The findings of this experiment showed that apes understood and accurately anticipated the behavior of an individual who held a false belief.

There has been some controversy over the interpretation of evidence purporting to show theory of mind ability—or inability—in animals. Part of this debate has involved whether animals are really able to associate cognitive abilities with another individual, or if they are just able to read and understand behavior. Povinelli et al. (1990) points out that most evidence in support of great ape theory of mind involves naturalistic settings to which the apes have already adapted through past learning. Their "reinterpretation hypothesis" explains away evidence supporting attribution of mental states to others in chimpanzees as merely evidence of risk-based learning; that is, the chimpanzees learn through experience that certain behaviors in other chimpanzees have a probability of leading to certain responses, without necessarily attributing knowledge or other intentional states to those other chimpanzees. They have proposed testing theory of mind abilities in great apes in novel, and not naturalistic settings. Experimenters since then, such as demonstrated in Krupenye et al. (2016), have gone to extensive lengths to control for behavioral cues by placing the apes in novel settings as suggested by Povinelli and colleagues. Research has shown that there is substantial evidence for some non-human primates to track the mental state, like desires and beliefs, of other individuals that cannot be deduced to a response of learned behavioural cues.

==== Communication in the wild ====
For most of the 20th century, scientists who studied primates thought of vocalizations as physical responses to emotions and external stimuli. The first observations of primate vocalizations representing and referring to events in the exterior world were observed in vervet monkeys in 1967. Calls with specific intent, such as alarm calls or mating calls has been observed in many orders of animals, including primates. Researchers began to study vervet monkey vocalizations in more depth as a result of this finding. In the seminal study on vervet monkeys, researchers played recordings of three different types of vocalizations they use as alarm calls for leopards, eagles, and pythons. Vervet monkeys in this study responded to each call accordingly: going up trees for leopard calls, searching for predators in the sky for eagle calls, and looking down for snake calls. This indicated a clear communication that there is a predator nearby and what kind of predator it is, eliciting a specific response. The use of recorded sounds, as opposed to observations in the wild, gave researchers insight into the fact that these calls contain meaning about the external world. This study also produced evidence that suggests vervet monkeys improve in their ability to classify different predators and produce alarm calls for each predator as they get older. Further research into this phenomenon has discovered that infant vervet monkeys produce alarm calls for a wider variety of species than adults. Adults only use alarm calls for leopards, eagles, and pythons while infants produce alarm calls for land mammals, birds, and snakes respectively. Data suggests that infants learn how to use and respond to alarm calls by watching their parents.

A different species of monkeys, the wild Campbell's monkeys have also been known to produce a sequence of vocalization that require a specific order to elicit a specific behaviour in other monkeys. Changing the order of the sounds changes the resulting behaviour, or meaning, of the call. Diana monkeys were studied in a habituation-dishabituation experiment that demonstrated the ability to attend to the semantic content of calls rather than simply to acoustic nature. Primates have also been observed responding to alarm calls of other species. Crested Guinea fowl, a ground-dwelling fowl, produce a single type of alarm call for all predators it detects. Diana monkeys have been observed to respond to the most likely reason for the call, typically a human or leopard, based on the situation and respond according to that. If they deem a leopard is the more likely predator in the vicinity, they will produce their own leopard-specific alarm call, but if they think it is a human, they will remain silent and hidden.

The ability for non-human primates to understand call systems that belong to a different species of monkey happens but to a limited extent. In this case Diana monkeys and Campbell's monkeys often form mixed species groups but they seem only to respond to each other's danger related calls.

=== Tool use ===
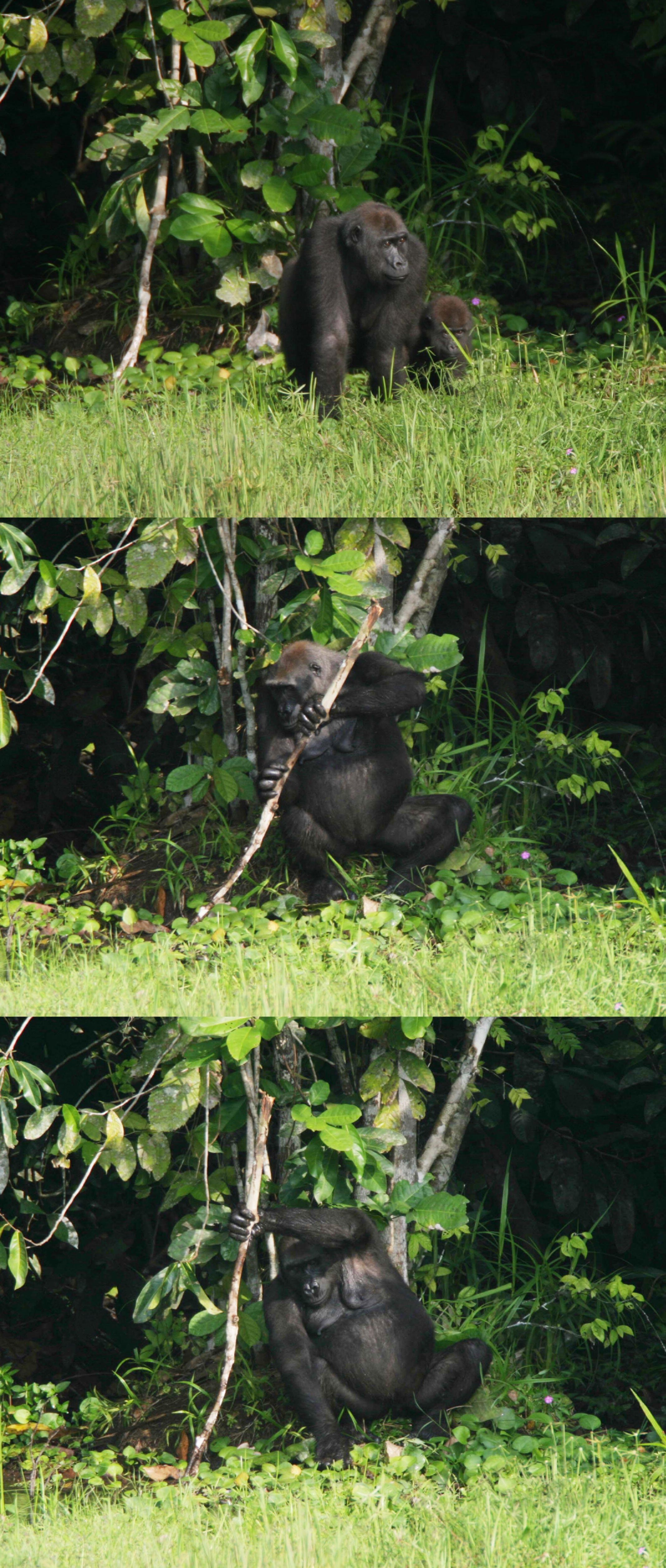
Tool use by a gorilla

There are many reports of primates making or using tools, both in the wild or when captive. Chimpanzees, gorillas, orangutans, capuchin monkeys, baboons, and mandrills have all been reported as using tools. The use of tools by primates is varied and includes hunting (mammals, invertebrates, fish), collecting honey, processing food (nuts, fruits, vegetables and seeds), collecting water, weapons and shelter.

Tool making is much rarer, but has been documented in orangutans, bonobos and bearded capuchin monkeys. Research in 2007 shows that chimpanzees in the Fongoli savannah sharpen sticks to use as spears when hunting, considered the first evidence of systematic use of weapons in a species other than humans. Captive gorillas have made a variety of tools. In the wild, mandrills have been observed to clean their ears with modified tools. Scientists filmed a large male mandrill at Chester Zoo (UK) stripping down a twig, apparently to make it narrower, and then using the modified stick to scrape dirt from underneath its toenails.

There is some more recent controversy over whether tool use represents a higher level of physical cognition, although this contradicts a long held tradition of tool use as conferring the highest status in the animal world. One study suggests that primates could use tools due to environmental or motivational clues, rather than an understanding of folk physics or a capacity for future planning.

=== Problem solving ===
In 1913, Wolfgang Köhler started writing a book on problem solving titled The Mentality of Apes (1917). In this research, Köhler observed the manner in which chimpanzees solve problems, such as that of retrieving bananas when positioned out of reach. He found that they stacked wooden crates to use as makeshift ladders in order to retrieve the food. If the bananas were placed on the ground outside of the cage, they used sticks to lengthen the reach of their arms.

Köhler concluded that the chimps had not arrived at these methods through trial-and-error (which American psychologist Edward Thorndike had claimed to be the basis of all animal learning, through his law of effect), but rather that they had experienced an insight (sometimes known as the Eureka effect or an "aha" experience), in which, having realized the answer, they then proceeded to carry it out in a way that was, in Köhler's words, "unwaveringly purposeful".

=== Asking questions ===
According to numerous published studies, apes are able to answer human questions, and the vocabulary of the acculturated apes contains question words.

Despite these abilities, the published research literature did not include instances of apes asking questions themselves; in human-primate conversations, questions were exclusively asked by humans. Ann and David Premack designed a methodology to teach apes to ask questions in the 1970s: "In principle, interrogation can be taught either by removing an element from a familiar situation in the animal's world or by removing the element from a language that maps the animal's world. It is probable that one can induce questions by purposefully removing key elements from a familiar situation. Suppose a chimpanzee received its daily ration of food at a specific time and place, and then one day the food was not there. A chimpanzee trained in the interrogative might inquire 'Where is my food?' or, in Sarah's case, 'My food is?' Sarah was never put in a situation that might induce such interrogation because for our purposes it was easier to teach Sarah to answer questions".

A decade later, the Premacks wrote: "Though [Sarah] understood the question, she did not herself ask any questions—unlike the child who asks interminable questions, such as What that? Who making noise? When Daddy come home? Me go Granny's house? Where puppy? Toy? Sarah never delayed the departure of her trainer after her lessons by asking where the trainer was going, when she was returning, or anything else".

Joseph Jordania suggested that the ability to ask questions could be the crucial cognitive threshold between human and other ape mental abilities. Jordania suggested that asking questions is not a matter of the ability to use syntactic structures, that it is primarily a matter of cognitive ability.

== g factor of intelligence in primates ==
The general factor of intelligence, or g factor, is a psychometric construct that summarizes the correlations observed between an individual's scores on various measures of cognitive abilities. First described in humans, the g factor has since been identified in a number of nonhuman species.

Primates in particular have been the focus of g research due to their close taxonomic links to humans. A principal component analysis run in a meta-analysis of 4,000 primate behaviour papers including 62 species found that 47% of the individual variance in cognitive ability tests was accounted for by a single factor, controlling for socio-ecological variables. This value fits within the accepted range of the influence of g on IQ.

However, there is some debate as to the influence of g on all primates equally. A 2012 study identifying individual chimpanzees that consistently performed highly on cognitive tasks found clusters of abilities instead of a general factor of intelligence. This study used individual-based data and claim that their results are not directly comparable to previous studies using group data that have found evidence for g. Further research is required to identify the exact nature of g in primates.

== See also ==
- Animal cognition
- Cognitive tradeoff hypothesis
- Deep social mind
- Hominid intelligence
- Great ape language
- Primate empathy
- Primate archaeology
- Pig intelligence
