= Alison Mason Kingsbury =

American painter

- Born: 1898; Durham, New Hampshire
- Died: 1988 (aged 89–90)
- Education: Wellesley College
- Movement: Neoclassical, art nouveau, regionalism
- Spouse: Morris Bishop

Alison Mason Kingsbury Bishop (born Alison Mason Kingsbury; 1898–1988) was an American artist who lived and worked in Ithaca, New York. Known professionally by her maiden name, her work features the landscapes of the Finger Lakes region and residential neighborhoods of Ithaca.

== Early life ==
Kingsbury was born in Durham, New Hampshire, to Albert Kingsbury and Alison Mason. She graduated from Wellesley College in 1920 and moved to New York City to study at the Art Students League. She later served as an art instructor at Wellesley, studying architecture and mural design with Charles Howard Walker. In 1922, Kingsbury joined the École des Beaux-Arts at Fontainebleau in France, where she studied fresco with Paul Albert Baudouin and sculpture and mural composition with Alfred Janniot.

== Career ==
Upon her return to the United States, Kingsbury worked for the muralist Ezra Winter. In 1925, Kingsbury accompanied Winter to Ithaca for a commission by Cornell University for the Willard Straight Hall Mural, during which time she met her husband, Morris Bishop, and moved to Ithaca permanently. Kingsbury and Winter later collaborated on a mural in Radio City Music Hall called Fountain of Youth in 1932.

Though best known for her paintings in oil, watercolors, and mural media, Kingsbury also produced several screens in the early 1930s and graphic works throughout her career. She provided illustrations for some of her husband's written works, illustrated her own work of children's fiction, The Adventures of Phunsi (1946), and illustrated a tenth edition of the Fanny Farmer cookbook series.

Her very early work reflects her interest in Neoclassical artists and the Art Nouveau style, whereas her later work, which focused on her immediate surroundings, was influenced by Regionalism. Her regionalist works were the most well received of her career, drawing recognition from mainstream media, such as Art Digest: "New York State landscapes by Alison Mason Kingsbury cast a hushed silence through the room with their panoramic, unpeopled expanse... The Finger Lakes District... is ideally suited to the miles and miles that she lays to view in a set of strikingly original canvases. Her color is clear and sensitive to atmosphere. The work is therapeutic for jaded and jangled city nerves". Some of her work - in particular The Onion Fields - draws on the legacy of the widely known Mexican muralists in both its style and labor-based subject matter.

Shifts in Kingsbury's style and subject matter reflect shifts in her surroundings; following her move late in her life from a large home in Cayuga Heights with expansive views to a smaller downtown residence, her work shifted from landscapes featuring Cayuga Lake to townscapes featuring the idiosyncratic homes and neighborhoods of downtown Ithaca.

== Public work ==
Her public works include:

- World War I Memorial Chapel Mural 1930, Cornell University, Ithaca, New York
- The Onion Fields 1942, Canastota Post Office, Canastota, New York
