= David McCord =

American poet and college fundraiser (1897–1997)

Executive Director of the Harvard College Fund
- In office 1925–1963

Personal details
- Born: November 15, 1897 New York City, US
- Died: April 13, 1997 (aged 99)
- Education: Harvard University
- Occupation: poet
- Awards: Golden Rose Award; 1954 Guggenheim Fellow; finalist for the National Book Award, Children's Literature

David Thompson Watson McCord (November 15, 1897 in New York City – April 13, 1997) was an American poet and college fundraiser.

== Life ==
He grew up in Portland, Oregon where he graduated from Lincoln High School, and earned three degrees from Harvard University. His work appeared in Harper's.

He raised millions of dollars as executive director of the Harvard College Fund.

== Awards ==
- Golden Rose Award
- 1954 Guggenheim Fellow
- 1961 National Institute of Arts and Letters grant
- 1977, the first national award for Excellence in Poetry for Children from the National Council of Teachers of English
- Rudyard Kipling Fellow at Marlboro College in Vermont
- Benjamin Franklin Fellow at the Royal Society of Arts in London

Two collections of poems, The Star in the Pail and One at a Time were 1976 and 1978 finalists for the National Book Award, Children's Literature.

== Works ==
=== Poetry ===
- Oddly Enough. Washburn & Thomas. 1926.
- Far and few: rhymes of the never was and always is. Illustrator Henry B. Kane. Little, Brown. 1952. ISBN 978-0-316-55502-9.
- About Boston: sight, sound, flavor & inflection. Doubleday. 1948.
- An Acre for Education. Crimson Printing Co. 1954.
- Odds Without Ends. Little, Brown & Co. 1954.
- Take Sky. Little Brown & Company. 1962. ISBN 978-0-316-55509-8.
- Every Time I Climb A Tree. Little, Brown & Co. 1967.
- All Day Long. Bantam Books. 1971. ISBN 978-0-440-40376-0.
- The Star in the Pail. Little, Brown and Company. 1975. ISBN 0-316-55515-0.
- One At A Time. Little, Brown and Company. 1977. ISBN 9780316555166.
- Dinosaurs. Educational Development Corporation. 1977. ISBN 978-0-88110-119-5.

=== Essays ===
- The Camp at Lockjaw. Doubleday. 1952.
- In Sight of Sever: Essays from Harvard. Harvard University Press. 1963. ISBN 978-0-674-44701-1.

=== Editor ===
- David McCord, ed. (1945). What Cheer: An anthology of American and British humorous and witty verse, gathered, sifted, and salted, with an introduction. New York: Coward-McCann.

=== Appearances in others' anthologies ===
- Louis Untermeyer, ed. (1936). Modern American poetry: a critical anthology. Harcourt, Brace and company.
- David Lehman; John Brehm, eds. (2006). The Oxford book of American poetry. Oxford University Press. ISBN 978-0-19-516251-6.
