= Richard William Byrne =

Professor and researcher of cognitive and social behaviour

Academic work
- Institutions: University of St Andrews
- Main interests: Evolution of behavior

Richard William Byrne is an Emeritus Professor in the School of Psychology and Neuroscience of the University of St Andrews.

With an h-index of 77, he is renowned in the area of the evolution of cognitive and social behavior, and being one of the leading scholars of the Machiavellian intelligence hypothesis.

== Selected research ==
- Townsend, S.W., Koski, S.E., Byrne, R.W., Slocombe, K.E., Bickel, B., Boeckle, M., Braga Goncalves, I., Burkart, J.M., Flower, T., Gaunet, F. and Glock, H.J., 2017. Exorcising G rice's ghost: An empirical approach to studying intentional communication in animals. Biological Reviews, 92(3), pp. 1427–1433.
- Hobaiter, C. and Byrne, R.W., 2014. The meanings of chimpanzee gestures. Current Biology, 24(14), pp. 1596–1600.
- Hobaiter, C. and Byrne, R.W., 2011. Serial gesturing by wild chimpanzees: its nature and function for communication. Animal cognition, 14(6), pp. 827–838.
- Hobaiter, C. and Byrne, R.W., 2011. The gestural repertoire of the wild chimpanzee. Animal cognition, 14(5), pp. 745–767.
- Whiten, A. and Byrne, R.W., 1988. Taking (Machiavellian) intelligence apart. Clarendon Press/Oxford University Press.
