= Andrew Whiten =

British zoologist and psychologist

Andrew Whiten FBA FSB FBPsS FRSE
- Born: David Andrew Whiten; 1948 (age 77–78); Grimsby, England
- Known for: research in social cognition
- Title: Professor of Evolutionary and Developmental Psychology; Professor Wardlaw Emeritus at University of St Andrews in Scotland
- Awards: 2001 Delwart International Scientific Prize; 2007 Rivers Memorial Medal; 2007 Osman Hill Medal; 2014 Sir James Black Medal; 2015 Senior Prize and Medal for Public Engagement

Academic background
- Education: University of Sheffield: Zoology; University of Bristol: PhD in Psychology

Academic work
- Discipline: Psychology
- Sub-discipline: Evolutionary psychology; Developmental psychology
- Institutions: University of St Andrews
- Main interests: evolution of social cognition in human and non-human primates
- Website: Andrew Whiten

David Andrew Whiten, known as Andrew Whiten (born 1948), is a British zoologist and psychologist, Professor of Evolutionary and Developmental Psychology, and Professor Wardlaw Emeritus at University of St Andrews in Scotland. He is known for his research in social cognition, specifically on social learning, tradition and the evolution of culture, social Machiavellian intelligence, autism and imitation, as well as the behavioral ecology of sociality. In 1996, Whiten and his colleagues invented an artificial fruit that allowed them to study learning in apes and humans.

== Personal life and education ==
Whiten was born in 1948 in Grimsby, England. He graduated with a degree in zoology from the University of Sheffield and achieved a PhD in Psychology at the University of Bristol.

== Career ==
Whiten started reading and lecturing at the University of St Andrews in 1970, joined the Department of Psychology in St Andrews in 1975, and became professor of evolutionary and developmental psychology in 1997. Whiten was co-founder of the Scottish Primate Research Group. In 2003, he founded the Centre for Social Learning and Cultural Evolution at the University of St Andrews. He was the founder and first director of the primate research centre Living Links to Human Evolution (short: Living Links) that opened 2008 in Edinburgh Zoo and draws more than 250,000 visitors per year.

== Research ==
Whiten conducted long-term research on cultural evolution in chimpanzees and other primates and is noted for his contributions to this field. He has demonstrated the existence of traditions in primate culture in areas such as foraging, tool use and courtship. He has also shown that it is possible to introduce new traditions, by teaching primates in different groups different methods for getting a treat from a box. The first two chimps taught others, who almost always learned the method used first in their group. In another study, vervet monkeys which had learned to avoid grains of corn of a particular color (flavored by a bitter taste) relearned their color preferences for food once they became part of another group with different preferences.

Such transmission chain studies have shown cultural learning between individuals in at least 20 different species. The ability to learn from others is particularly important for adaptability under changing conditions such as climate change.

== Fellowships ==
Whiten is member of the following learned societies:

- British Academy since 2000
- British Psychological Society since 2000
- Royal Society of Edinburgh since 2001
- Cognitive Science Society since 2013

He was member of the Editorial Board of the Philosophical Transactions of the Royal Society, Biological Sciences, from 2008 to 2013. He additionally chaired the Research Awards Committee of the British Academy from 2011 to 2013.

== Awards and honors ==
Whiten was awarded the Delwart International Scientific Prize by the Royal Academies for Science and the Arts of Belgium in 2001, the Rivers Memorial Medal of the Royal Anthropological Institute (RAI), and the Osman Hill Medal of the Primate Society of Great Britain in 2007. He is the first and only scientist who was awarded both, the Sir James Black Medal (in 2014) and the Senior Prize and Medal for Public Engagement (in 2015) by the Royal Society of Edinburgh.

He was awarded an honorary doctor of the Heriot-Watt University in Edinburgh in 2015, of the University of Stirling in 2016, and of the University of Edinburgh in 2016/2017.

== Selected works ==
- Whiten, Andrew (2017). "Social Learning and Culture in Child and Chimpanzee". Annual Review of Psychology. 68: 129–154. doi:10.1146/annurev-psych-010416-044108. PMID 28051932.
- Whiten, Andrew (2015). "Experimental studies illuminate the cultural transmission of percussive technologies in Homo and Pan". Philosophical Transactions of the Royal Society B: Biological Sciences. 370 (1682) 20140359. doi:10.1098/rstb.2014.0359. PMC 4614722. PMID 26483537.
- Van De Waal, E.; Borgeaud, C.; Whiten, A. (2013). "Potent Social Learning and Conformity Shape a Wild Primate's Foraging Decisions". Science. 340 (6131): 483–485. Bibcode:2013Sci...340..483V. doi:10.1126/science.1232769. PMID 23620053. S2CID 206546598.
- Whiten, Andrew; Erdal, David (2012). "The human socio-cognitive niche and its evolutionary origins". Philosophical Transactions of the Royal Society B: Biological Sciences. 367 (1599): 2119–2129. doi:10.1098/rstb.2012.0114. PMC 3385679. PMID 22734055.
- Whiten, Andrew; Hinde, Robert A.; Laland, Kevin N.; Stringer, Christopher B. (2011). "Culture evolves". Philosophical Transactions of the Royal Society B: Biological Sciences. 366 (1567): 938–948. doi:10.1098/rstb.2010.0372. PMC 3049105. PMID 21357216.
- Whiten, Andrew; Horner, Victoria; De Waal, Frans B. M. (2005). "Conformity to cultural norms of tool use in chimpanzees". Nature. 437 (7059): 737–740. Bibcode:2005Natur.437..737W. doi:10.1038/nature04047. PMID 16113685. S2CID 4408848.
- Whiten, A.; Goodall, J.; McGrew, W. C.; Nishida, T.; Reynolds, V.; Sugiyama, Y.; Tutin, C. E. G.; Wrangham, R. W.; Boesch, C. (1999). "Cultures in chimpanzees". Nature. 399 (6737): 682–685. Bibcode:1999Natur.399..682W. doi:10.1038/21415. PMID 10385119. S2CID 4385871.
- Whiten, Andrew; Custance, Deborah M.; Gomez, Juan-Carlos; Teixidor, Patricia; Bard, Kim A. (1996). "Imitative learning of artificial fruit processing in children (Homo sapiens) and chimpanzees (Pan troglodytes)". Journal of Comparative Psychology. 110 (1): 3–14. doi:10.1037/0735-7036.110.1.3. PMID 8851548.
- A. Whiten, Richard W. Byrne (ed.): Machiavellian intelligence. Social expertise and the evolution of intellect in monkeys, apes, and humans, 1988.
