= Accessory navicular bone =

Accessory bone of the foot that occasionally develops abnormally in front of the ankle

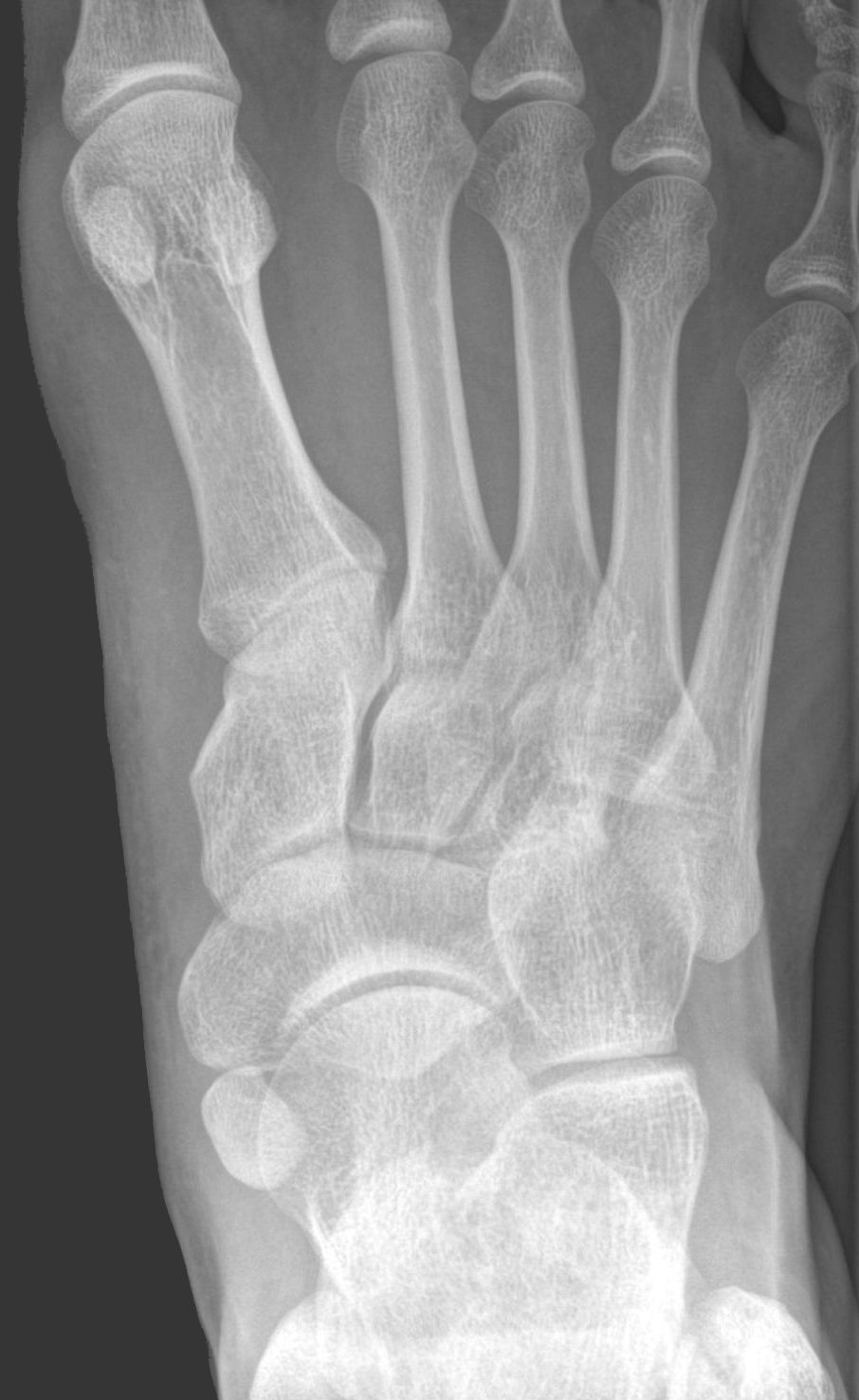
- X-ray of the foot showing an accessory navicular bone

Details

Identifiers
- Latin: os tibiale, os tibiale externum or naviculare secundarium
- MeSH: C536002

An accessory navicular bone is an accessory bone of the foot that occasionally develops abnormally in front of the ankle towards the inside of the foot. This bone may be present in approximately 2-14% of the general population and is usually asymptomatic. When it is symptomatic, surgery may be necessary.

Accessory navicular bone may cause a continuous stretch and stress on the tibialis posterior tendon which can progress to chronic disabling pain and may cause tendon rupture or secondary flat foot deformity; when this occurs this condition is commonly known as accessory navicular syndrome.

Other conditions which closely mimic the symptoms of an accessory navicular bone include plantar fasciitis, bunions and heel spurs.

== Classification ==
The Geist classification divides the accessory navicular bones into three types.

- Type 1: An os tibiale externum is a 2–3 mm sesamoid bone in the distal posterior tibialis tendon. Usually asymptomatic.
- Type 2: Triangular or heart-shaped ossicle measuring up to 12 mm, which represents a secondary ossification center connected to the navicular tuberosity by a 1–2 mm layer of fibrocartilage or hyaline cartilage. Portions of the posterior tibialis tendon sometimes insert onto the accessory ossicle, which can cause dysfunction, and therefore, symptoms.
- Type 3: A cornuate navicular bone represents an enlarged navicular tuberosity, which may represent a fused Type 2 accessory bone. Occasionally symptomatic due to bunion formation.

== Diagnosis ==
To diagnose accessory navicular syndrome, the foot and ankle surgeon will ask about symptoms and examine the foot, looking for skin irritation or swelling. The doctor may press on the bony prominence to assess the area for discomfort. Foot structure, muscle strength, joint motion and the way the patient walks may also be evaluated. X-rays are usually ordered to confirm the diagnosis. If there is ongoing pain or inflammation, an MRI or other advanced imaging tests may be used to further evaluate the condition.

== Treatment ==
Aside from surgery, there are a few options for handling an accessory navicular bone that has become symptomatic. This includes immobilization, icing, medicating, physical therapy, and orthotic devices. Immobilizing involves placing the foot and ankle in a cast or removable walking boot. This alleviates stressors on the foot and can decrease inflammation. Icing will help reduce swelling and inflammation. Medication involves usage of nonsteroidal anti-inflammatory drugs, or steroids (taken orally or injected) to decrease inflammation. Physical therapy can be prescribed in order to strengthen the muscles and help decrease inflammation. Physical therapy can also help prevent the symptoms from returning. Orthotic devices (arch support devices that fit in a shoe) can help prevent future symptoms. Occasionally, the orthotic device will dig into the edge of the accessory navicular and cause discomfort. For this reason, the orthotic devices made for the patient should be carefully constructed.

== Radiological images ==
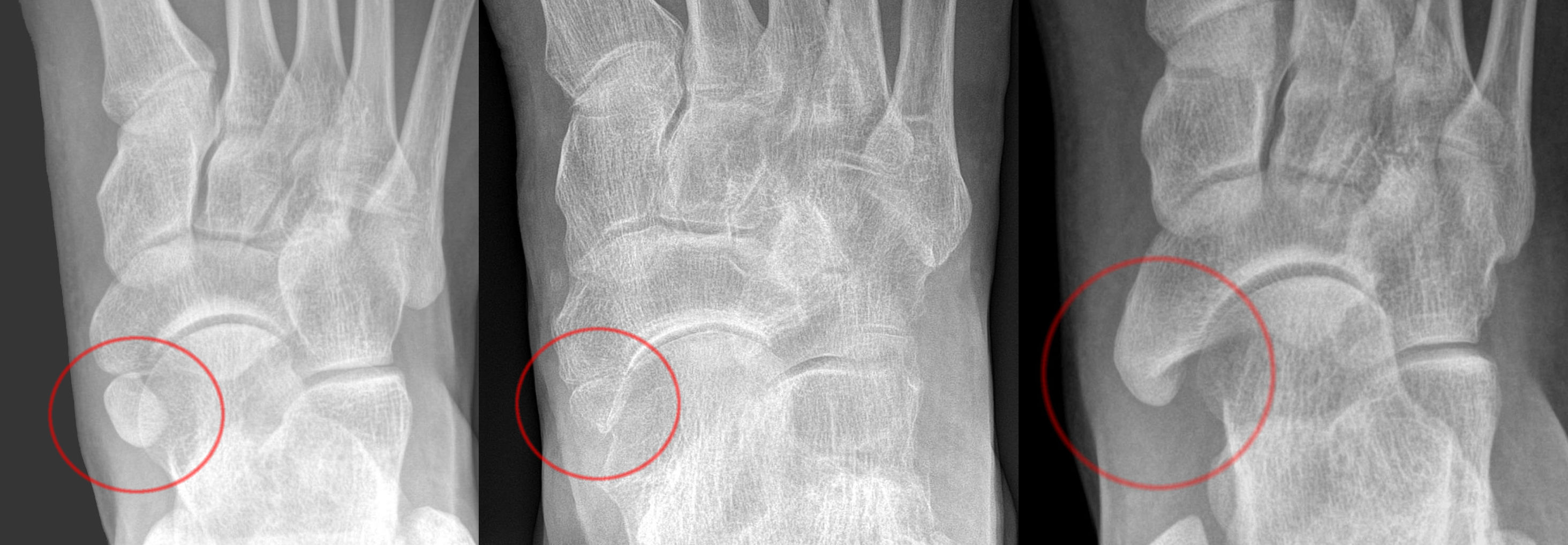
From left to right: Type 1, 2 and 3

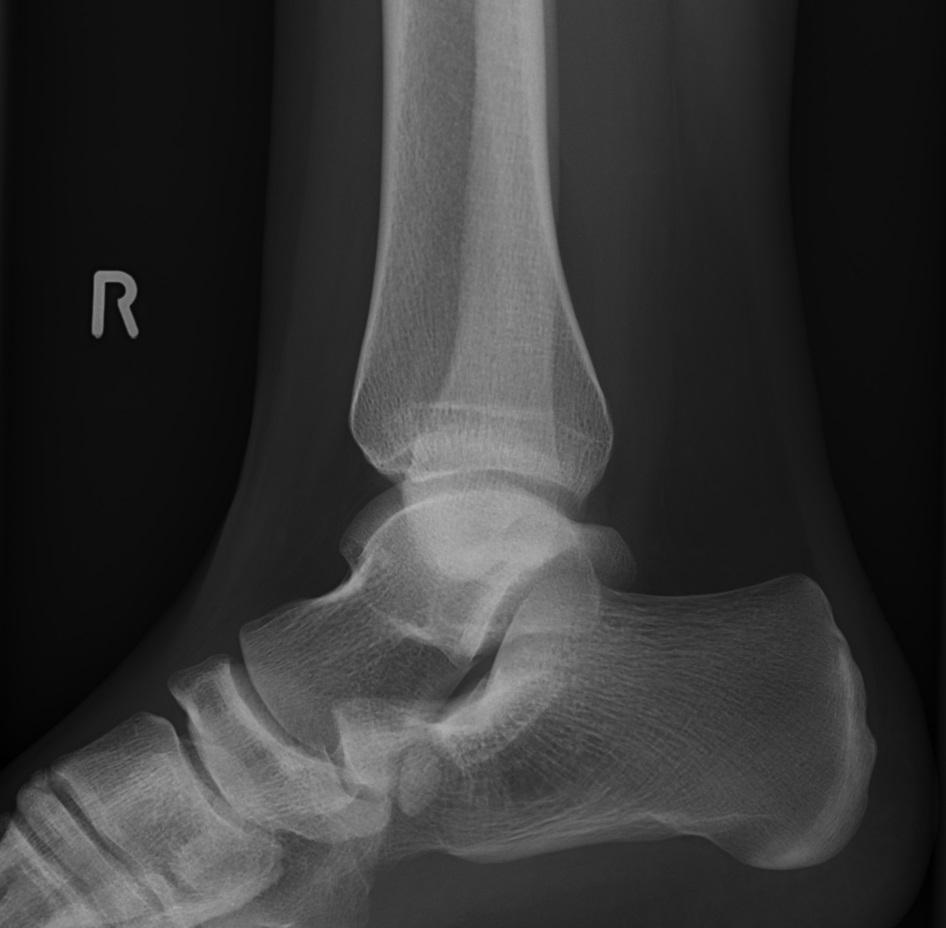
Lateral projection of type 2

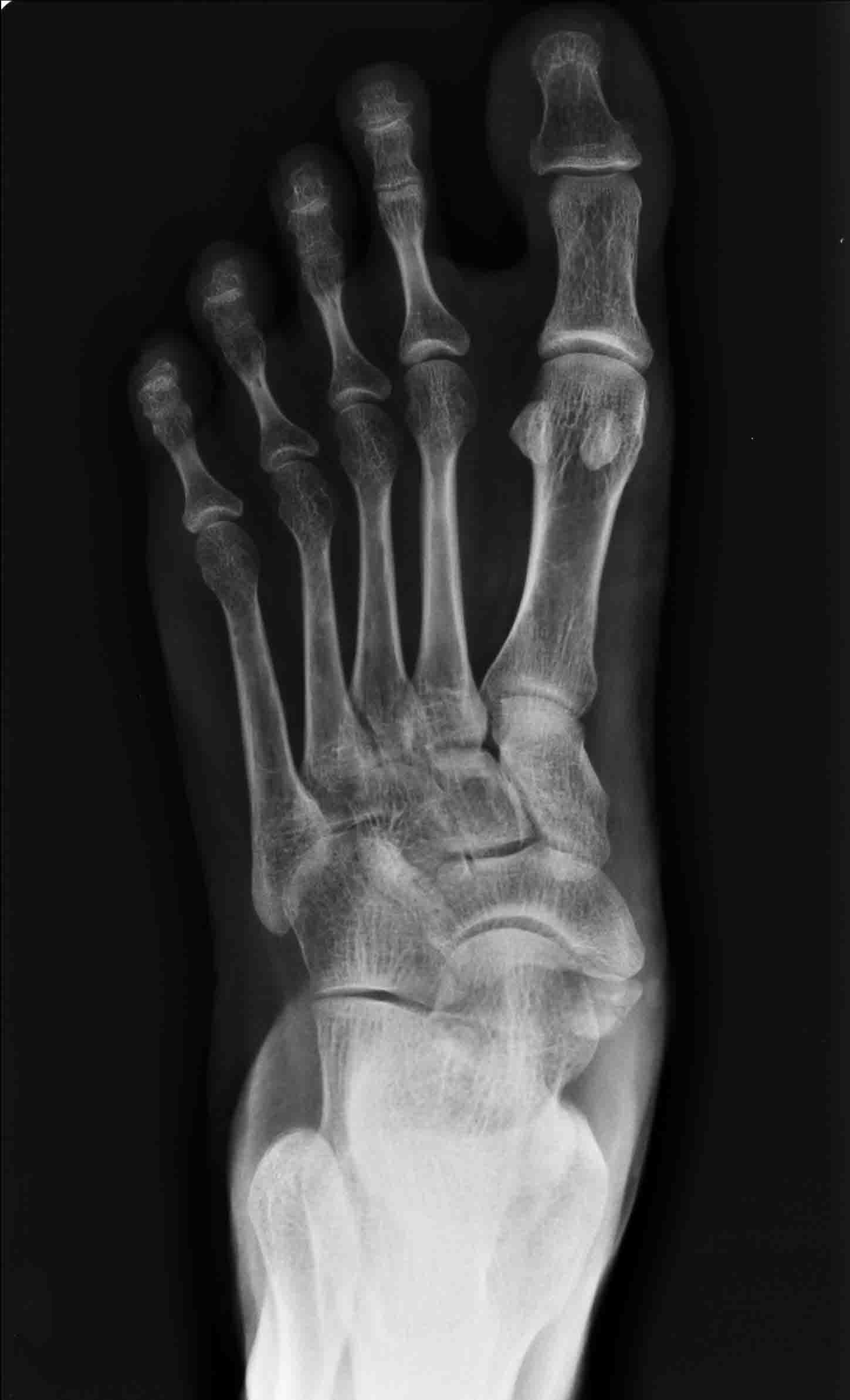
Type 2

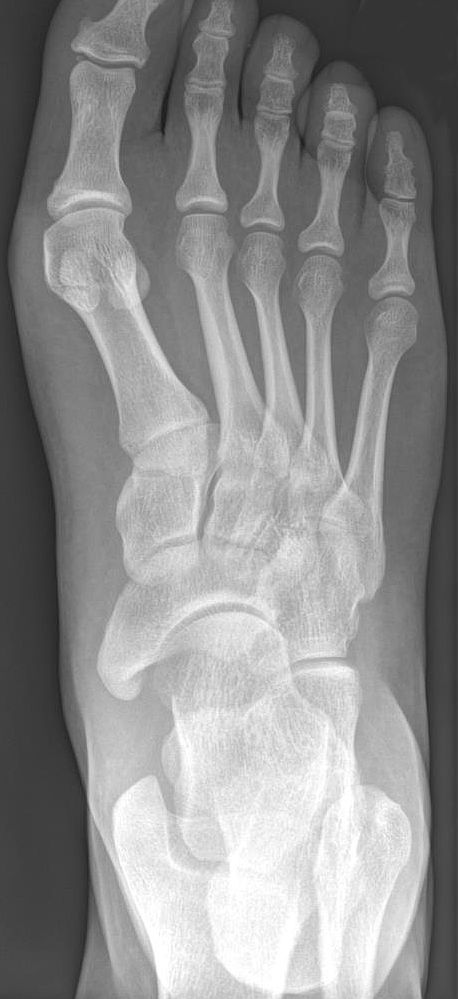
Cornuate navicular bone

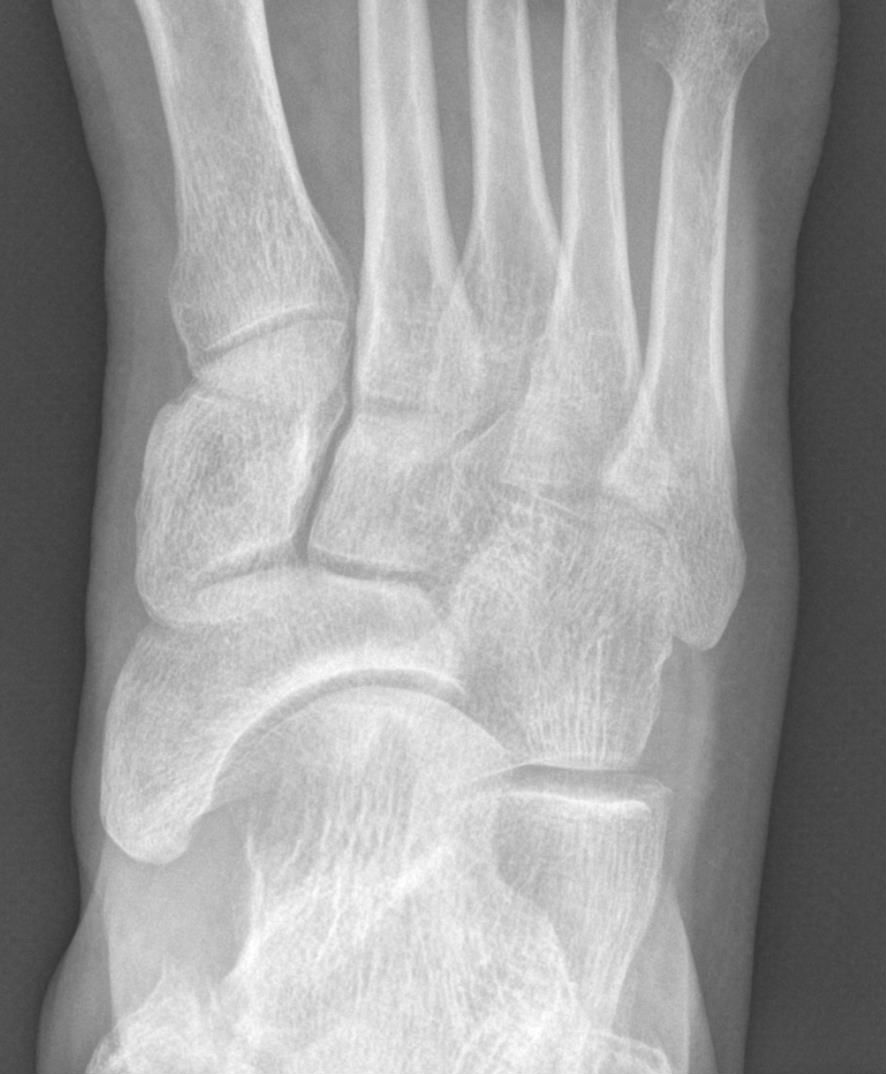
Cornuate navicular bone

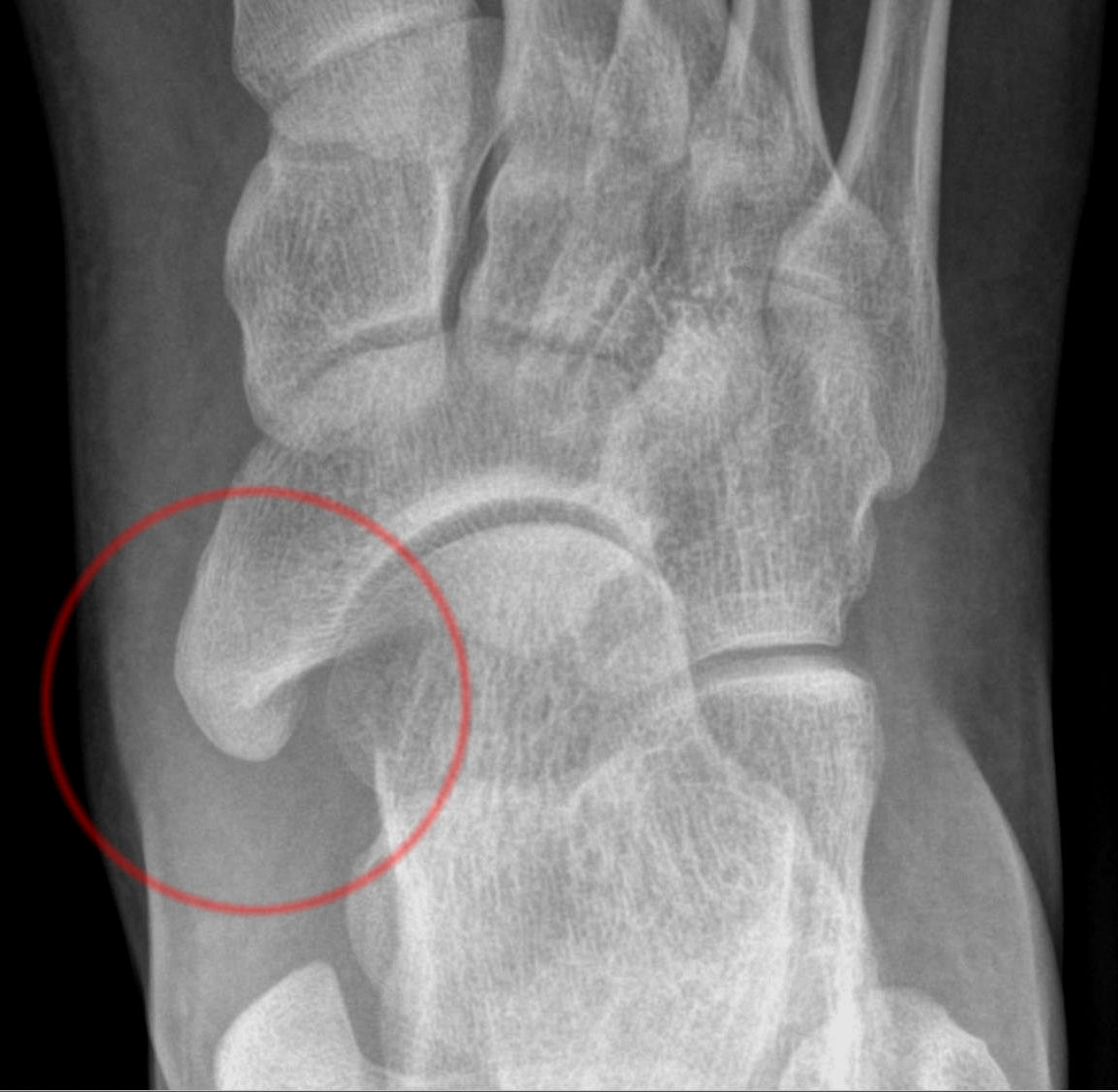
Cornuate navicular bone

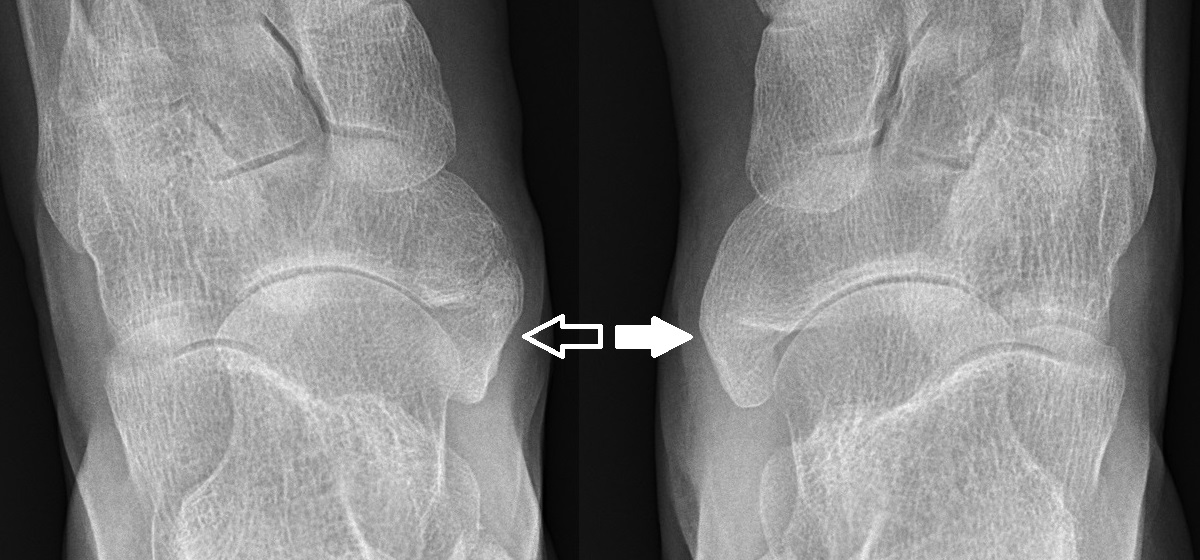
Type 2 on one foot (dark arrow) and type 3 on the other (white arrow)
