= Os triangulare =

Os triangulare may refer to:

- Triquetral bone
- A nearby accessory bone of the wrist
