= Fabella sign =

Pattern seen in radiologic examinations

- Differential diagnosis: synovial effusion

The fabella sign is displacement of the fabella that is seen in cases of synovial effusion and popliteal fossa masses.

The fabella is an accessory ossicle located inside the gastrocnemius lateral head tendon on the posterior side of the knee, in about 25% of people. It can thus serve as a surrogate radio-opaque marker of the posterior border of the knee's synovium. On a lateral radiograph of the knee, an increase in the distance from the fabella to the femur or to the tibia can be suggestive of fluid or of a mass within the synovial fossa. This is of particular use in radiographic detection of knee effusions, as the cause for the effusion may obscure the subcutaneous planes on x-ray that can also be used to determine presence of effusion or effusion size.
