= Accessory bone =

Additional bone found in some people

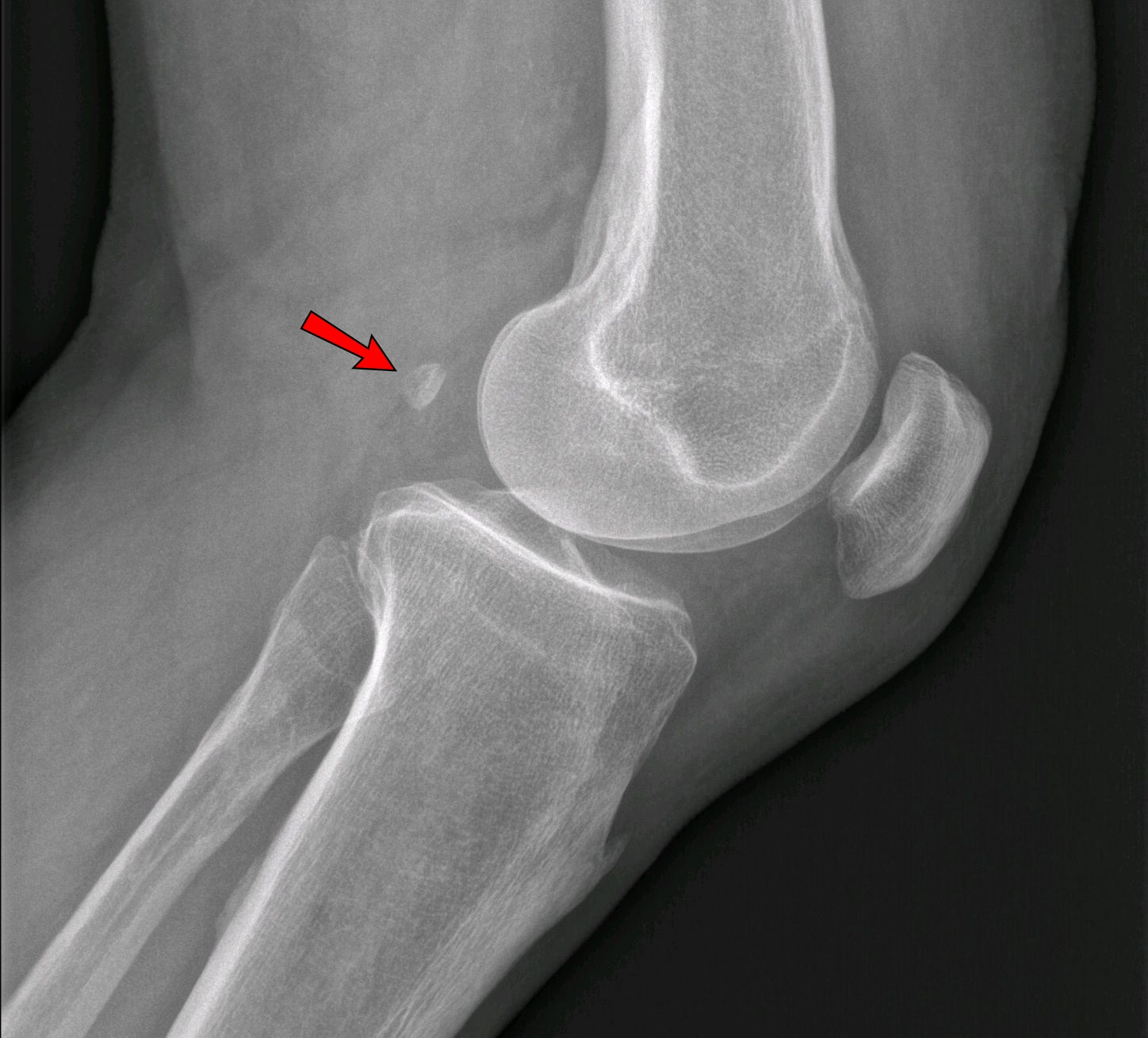
The fabella is present in 10% to 30% of individuals.

An accessory bone or supernumerary bone is a bone that is not normally present in the body, but can be found as a variant in a significant number of people. It poses a risk of being misdiagnosed as bone fractures on radiography.

== Wrist and hand ==
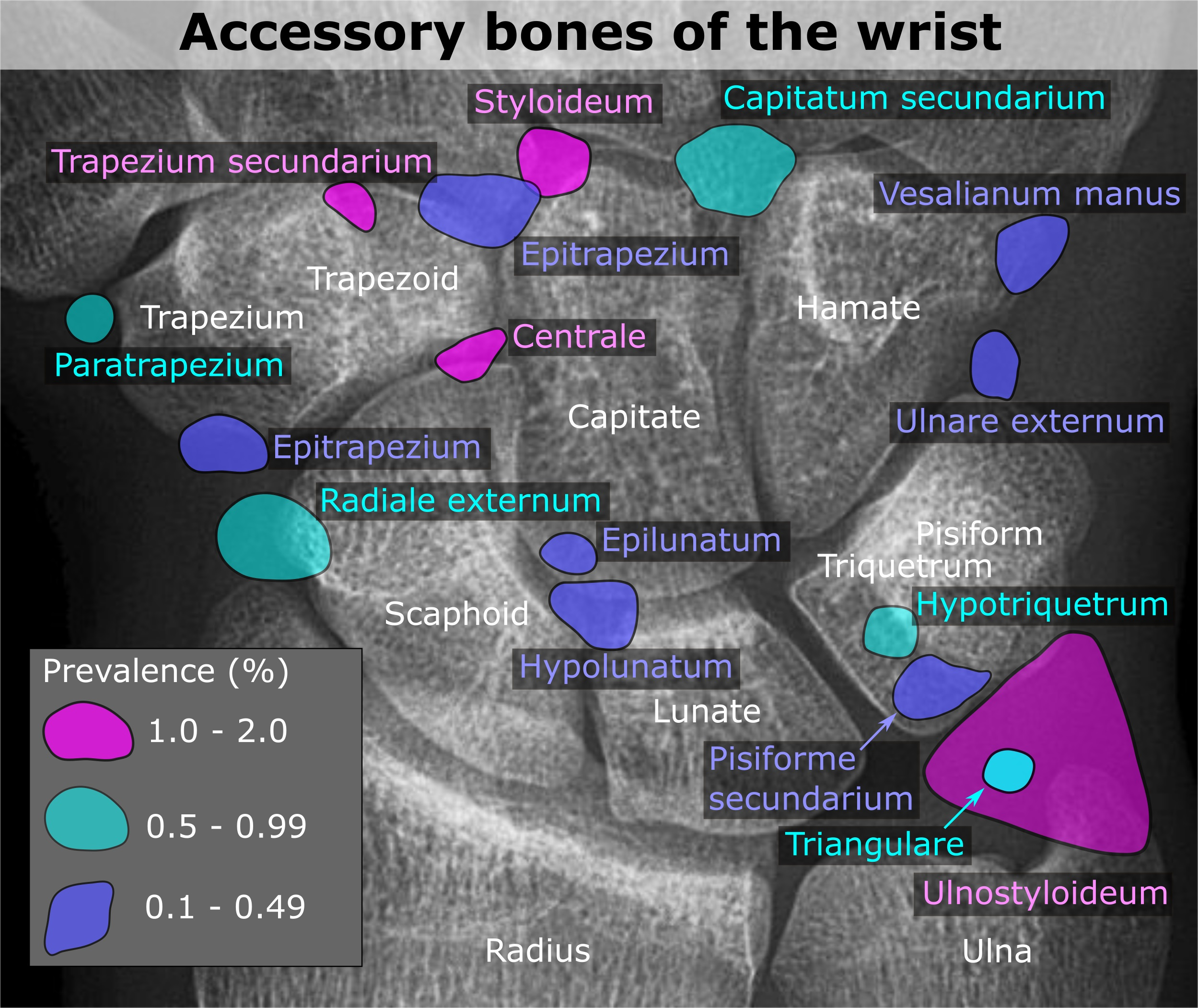
X-ray of the wrist, with most common accessory bones labeled.

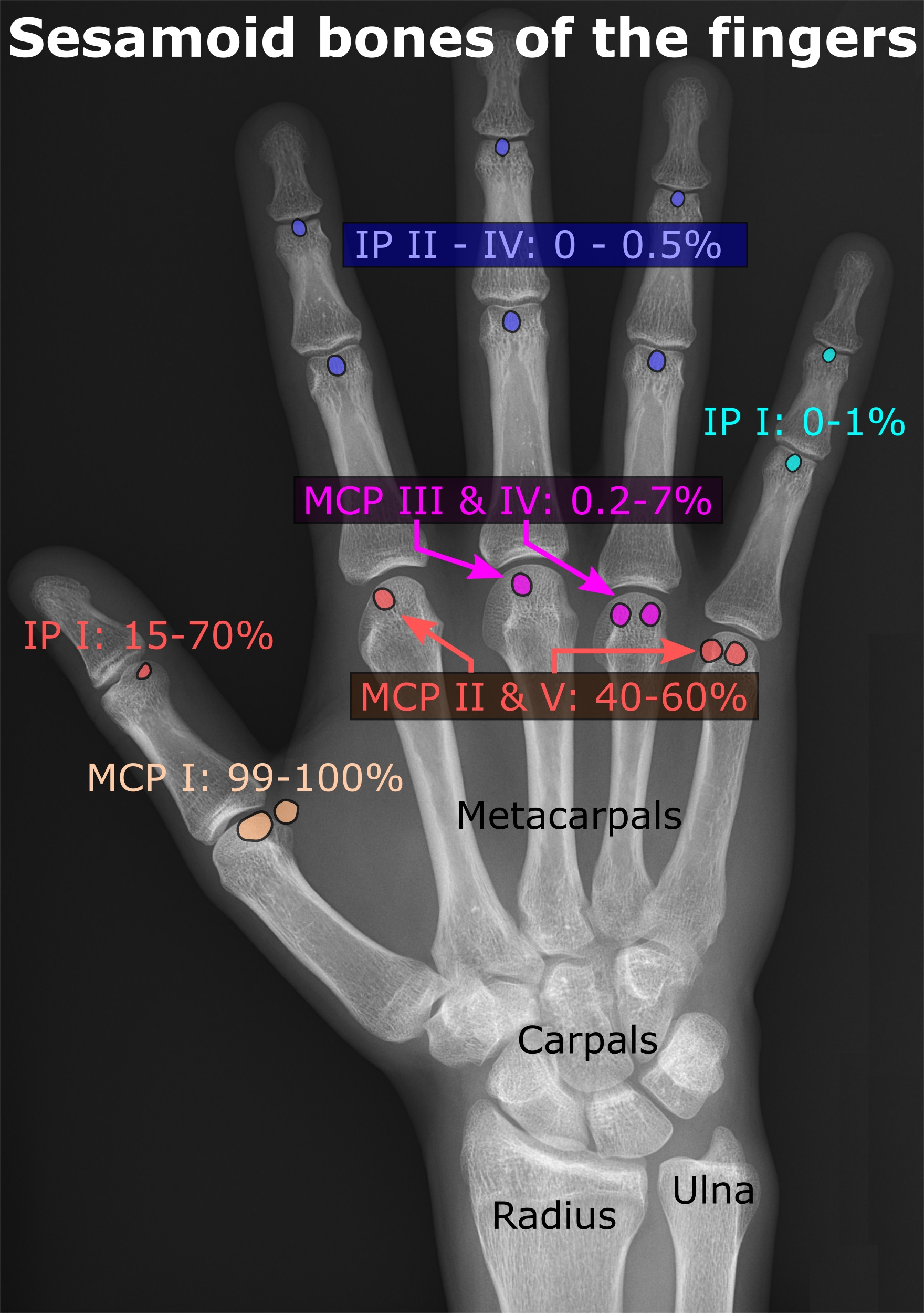
Prevalence and locations of sesamoid bones of the hand.

Accessory bone	Prevalence on the right (R) and left (L)
Os ulnostyloideum	1.5% R, 2.4% L
Os centrale	1.3% R, 2.1% L
Os trapezium secundarium	0.5% R, 2.1% L
Os styloideum	1.2% R, 1.2% L
Os radiale externum	1% R, 0.9% L
Os triangulare	1% R, 0.9% L
Os paratrapezium	0.3% R, 0.9% L
Os capitatum secundarium	0.8% R, 0.3% L
Os hypotriquetrum	0.5% R
Os hypolunatum	0.3% L
Os epilunatum	0.3% R, 0.3% L
Os ulnare externum	0.3% L
Os pisiforme secundarium	0.3% R
Os epitrapezium	0.3% L
Os vesalianum manus	0.3% L

=== Os ulnostyloideum ===
The os ulnostyloideum is an ulnar styloid process that is not fused to the rest of the ulna bone. On X-rays, an os ulnostyloideum is sometimes mistaken for an avulsion fracture of the styloid process. However, the distinction between these is extremely difficult. It is alleged that the os ulnostyloideum has a close relationship with or is synonymous with the os triquetrum secundarium.

=== Os centrale ===
The os carpi centrale (also briefly os centrale) is, where present, located on the dorsal side of the wrist between the scaphoid, the trapezoid and capitate, radially to the deep fossa of the capitate. The bone is present in almost every human embryo of 17–49 mm length, but then usually fuses with the ulnar side of the scaphoid. Sometimes it fuses with the capitate or the trapezoid. The literature also refers to an os centrale at the palm of the carpus, but this existence is questioned.

In most primates, including orangutans and gibbons, the os centrale is an independent bone that is attached to the scaphoid by strong ligaments. Conversely, in African apes and humans, the os centrale normally fuses to the scaphoid early in development. In chimpanzees, the bone fuses with the scaphoid first after birth, while in gibbons and orangutans this occurs first at older age. A good number of scholars have construed the scaphoid-centrale fusion as a functional adaptation to knuckle-walking, since a fused morphology would better cope with the increased shear stress on this joint during this kind of quadrupedal locomotion. The results from a simulation study have shown that fused scaphoid-centrales show lower stress values as compared to non fused morphologies, thus supporting a biomechanical explanation for the scaphoid-centrale fusion as a functional adaptation for knuckle-walking.

== Ankle ==
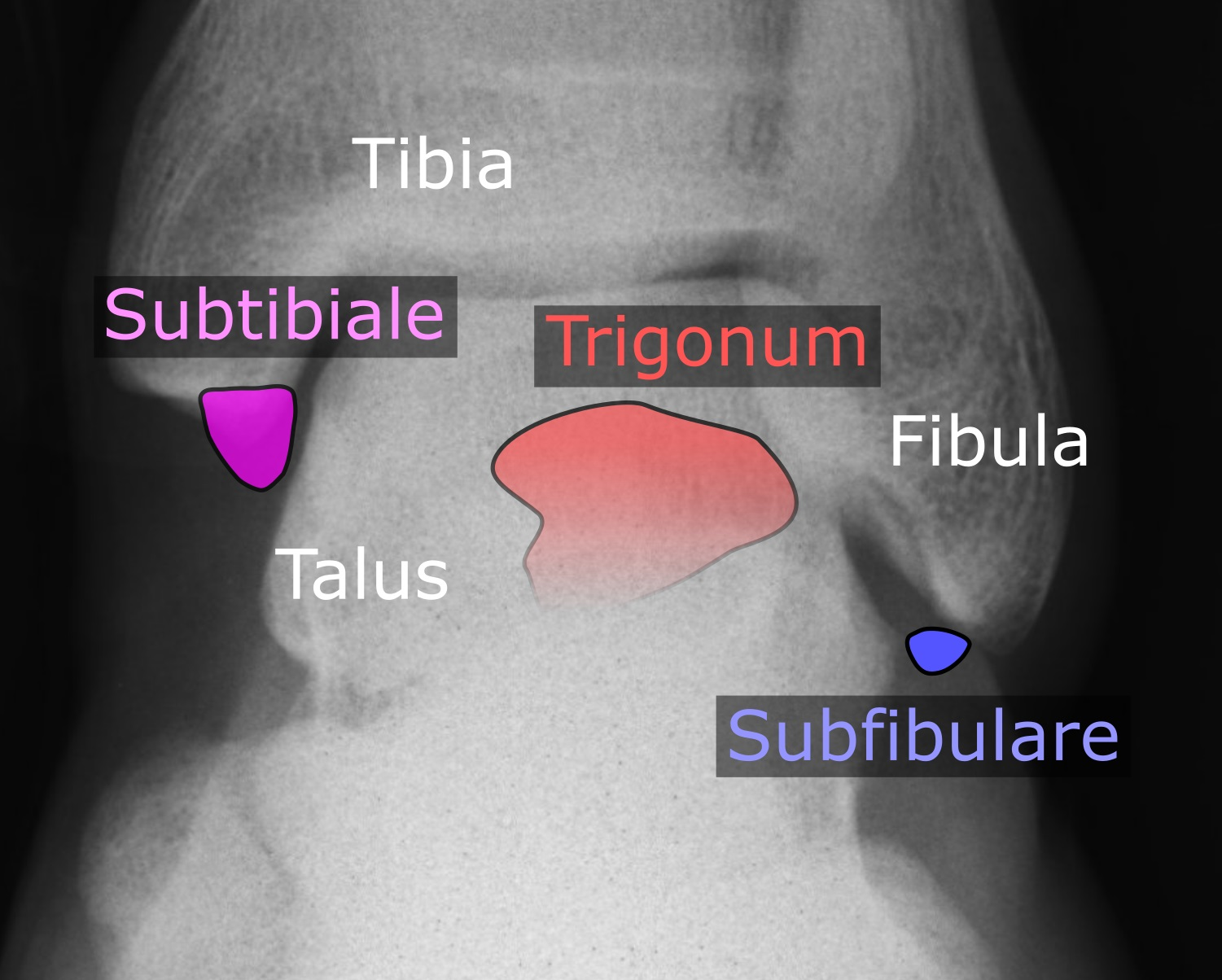
Accessory bones of the ankle.

Accessory bones at the ankle mainly include:

- Os subtibiale, with a prevalence of approximately 1%. It is a secondary ossification center of the distal tibia that appears during the first year of life, and which in most people fuses with the shaft at approximately 15 years in females and approximately 17 years in males.
- Os subfibulare, with a prevalence of approximately 0.2%.

Os trigonum (further described below) may also be seen on an ankle X-ray.

== Foot ==
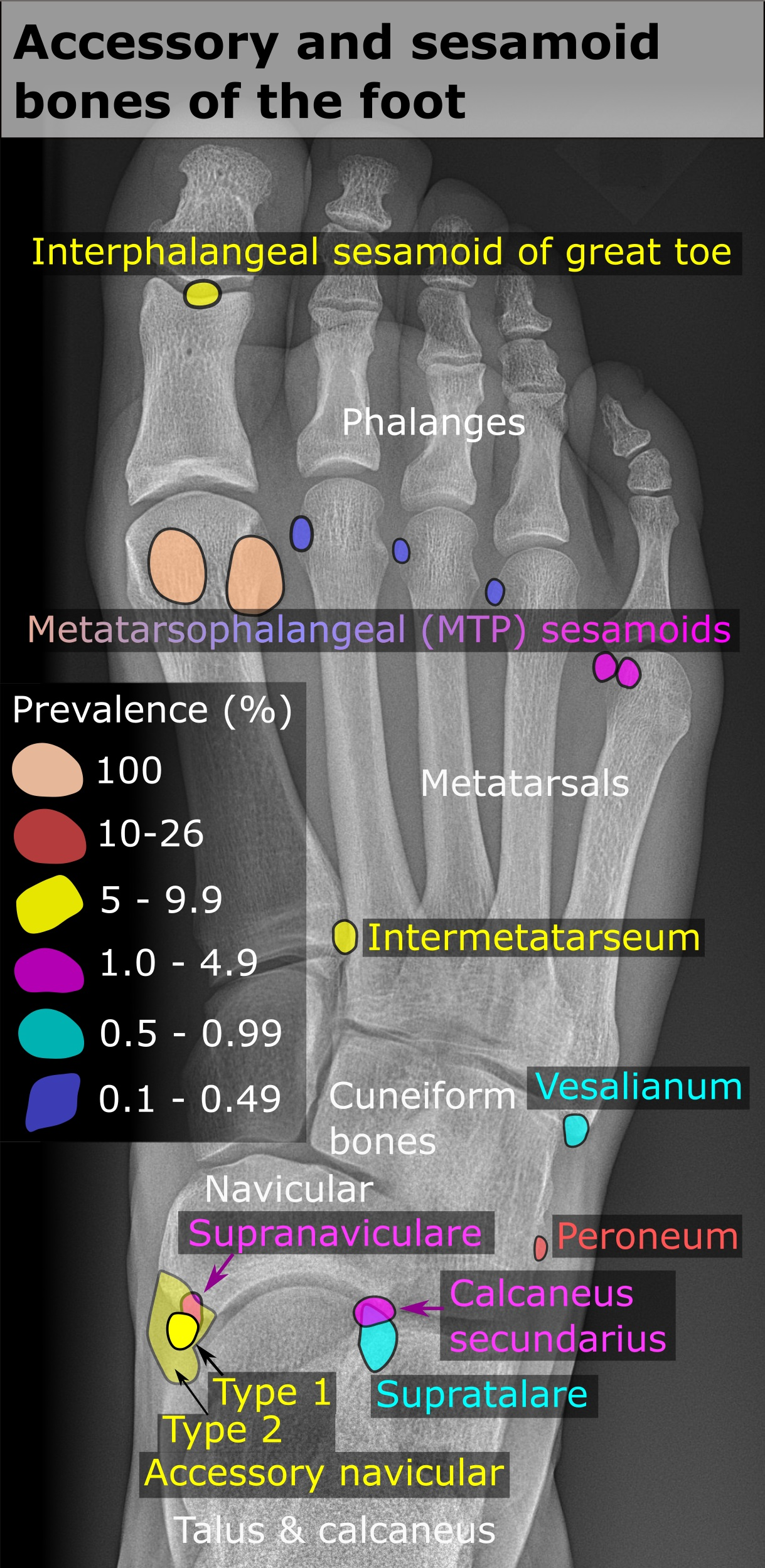
X-ray by dorsoplantar projection, with most common accessory and sesamoid bones of the foot.

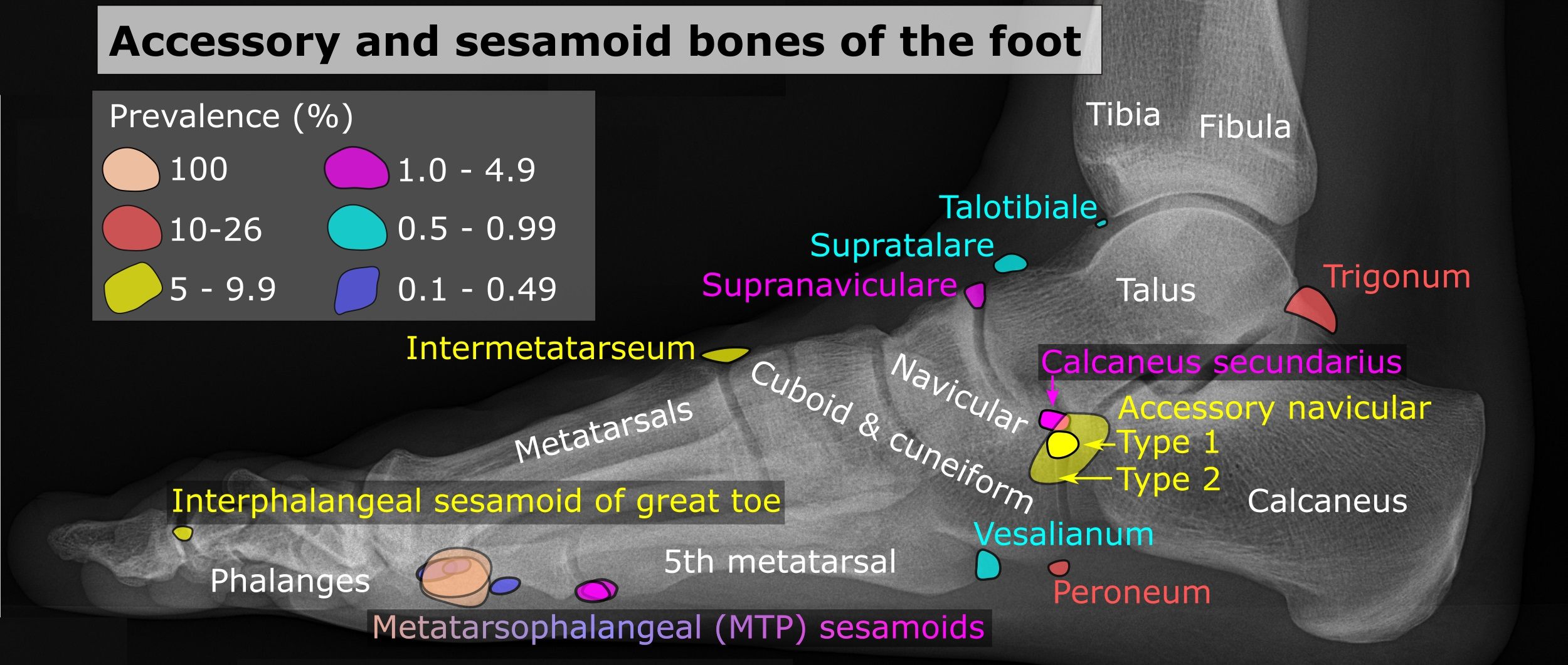
Lateral projection.

Bone	Prevalence
Sesamoid bones
Sesamoids at the metatarsophalangeal (MTP) joint of the great toe	Always present
Sesamoid of the second metatarsal	0.4%
Sesamoid of the third metatarsal	0.2%
Sesamoid of the fourth metatarsal	0.1%
Sesamoids of the fifth metatarsal	4.3%
Sesamoid of the interphalangeal (IP) joint of the great toe	2–13%
Ossicles
Os trigonum (not visible in this dorsoplantar projection)	7–25%
Os peroneum	Up to 26%
Accessory navicular	2–21%
Os intermetatarseum	1–13%
Os supranaviculare, also called the talonavicular bone	1.0–3.5%
Os calcaneus secundarium	0.6–7%
Os supratalare	0.2–2.4%
Os vesalianum	0.1–1%
Os talotibiale	0.5%

=== Accessory navicular ===
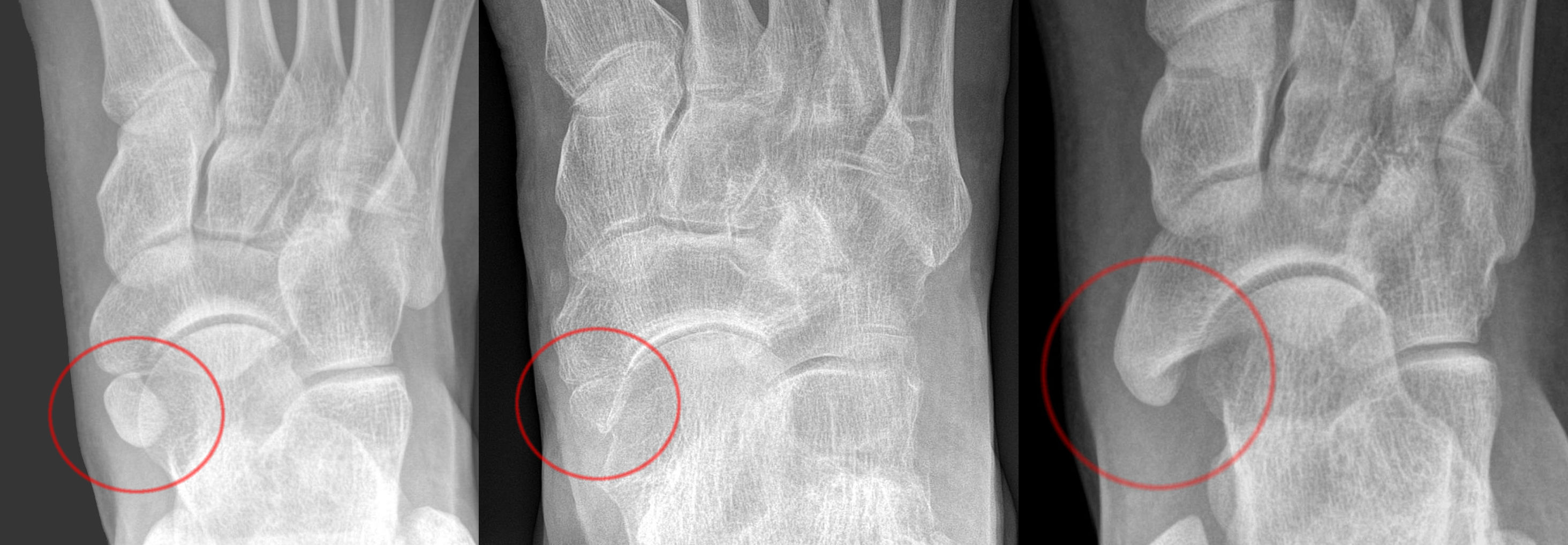
Accessory navicular types, from left to right: Type 1, 2 and 3.

An accessory navicular bone, also called os tibiale externum, occasionally develops in front of the ankle towards the inside of the foot. This bone may be present in approximately 2–21% of the general population and is usually asymptomatic. When it is symptomatic, surgery may be necessary.

The Geist classification divides the accessory navicular bones into three types.

- Type 1: An os tibiale externum is a 2–3 mm sesamoid bone in the distal posterior tibialis tendon. Usually asymptomatic.
- Type 2: Triangular or heart-shaped ossicle measuring up to 12 mm, which represents a secondary ossification center connected to the navicular tuberosity by a 1–2 mm layer of fibrocartilage or hyaline cartilage. Portions of the posterior tibialis tendon sometimes insert onto the accessory ossicle, which can cause dysfunction, and therefore, symptoms.
- Type 3: A cornuate navicular bone represents an enlarged navicular tuberosity, which may represent a fused Type 2 accessory bone. Occasionally symptomatic due to bunion formation.

=== Os trigonum ===
The os trigonum or accessory talus represents a failure of fusion of the lateral tubercle of the posterior process of the talus bone. Is estimated to be present in 7–25% of adults. It can be mistaken for an avulsion fracture of lateral tubercle of talus (Shepherd fracture) or a fracture of the Stieda process. In most cases, Os Trigonum will go unnoticed, but with some ankle injuries it can get trapped between the heel and ankle bones which irritates the surrounding structures, leading to Os Trigonum Syndrome.

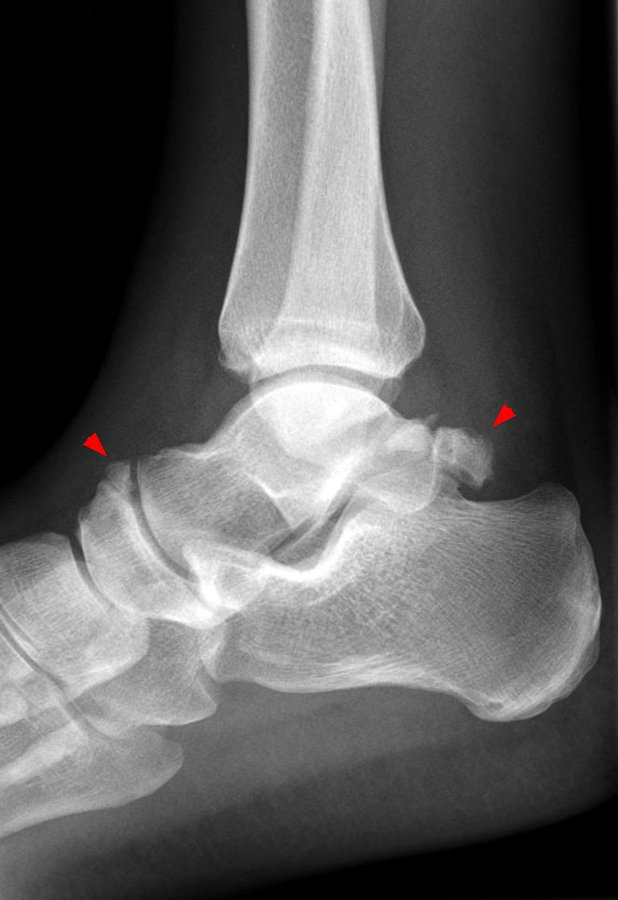

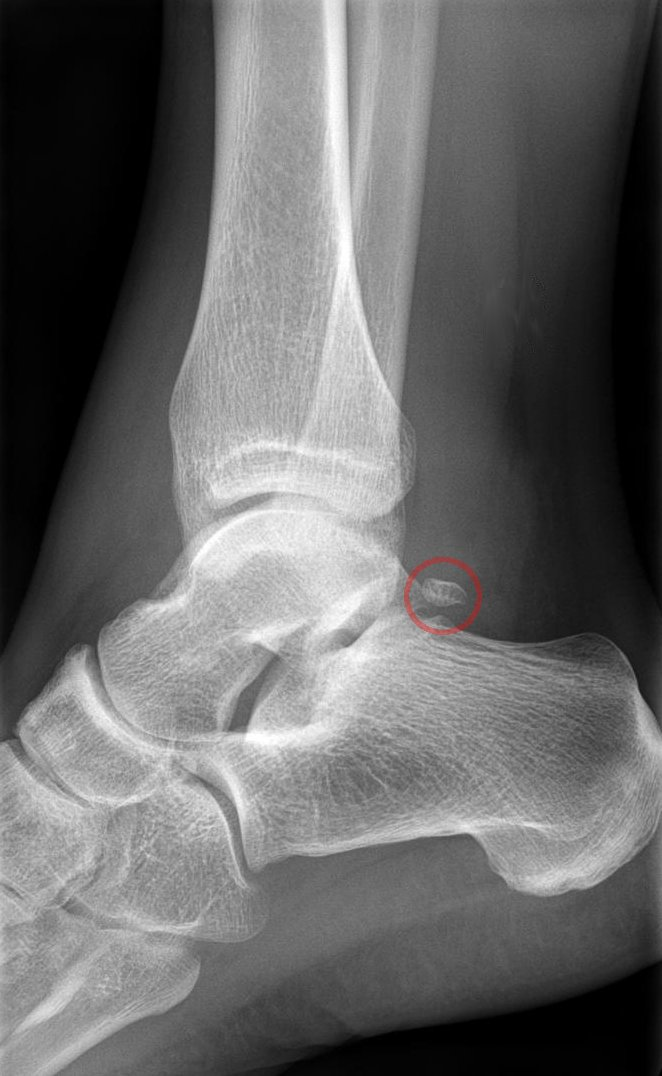

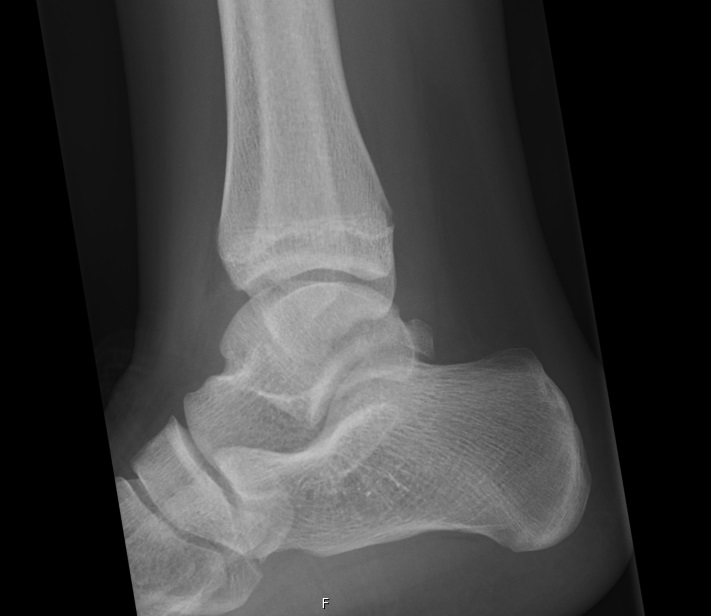

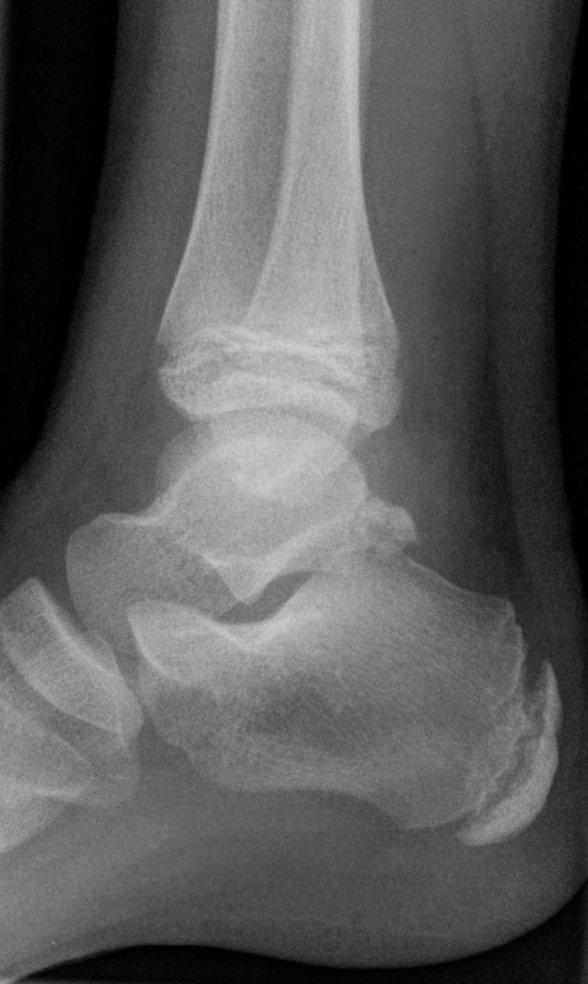

=== Less common accessory bones ===
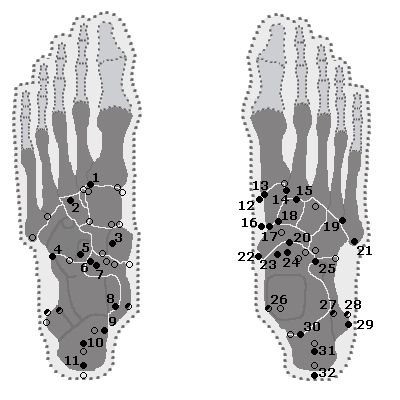
Image also including the locations of rare accessory bones of the foot: 1=Os cuneometatarsale I plantare, 2=os uncinatum, 3=os sesamoideum tibialis posterior, 4=os sesamoideum peroneum, 5=os cuboideum secundarium, 6=os trochleare calcanei, 7=os in sinus tarsi, 8=os sustentaculum tali, 9=os talocalcaneale posterius, 10=os aponeurosis plantaris, 11=os subcalcaneum, 12=os sesamoideum tibialis anterior, 13=os cuneometatarsale I tibiale, 14=os intermetatarsale I, 15=os cuneometatarsale II dorsale, 16=os paracuneiforme, 17=os cuneonaviculare, 18=os intercuneiforme, 19=os intermetatarsale IV, 20=os talonaviculare, 21=os vesalianum pedis, 22=os tibiale externum, 23=os talotibiale dorsale, 24=os supratalare, 25=os calcaneus secundarius, 26=os subtibiale, 27=os subfibulare, 28=os retinaculi, 29=os calcaneus accessorius, 30=os trigonum, 31=os supracalcaneum, 32=os tendinis calcanei

== Other locations ==
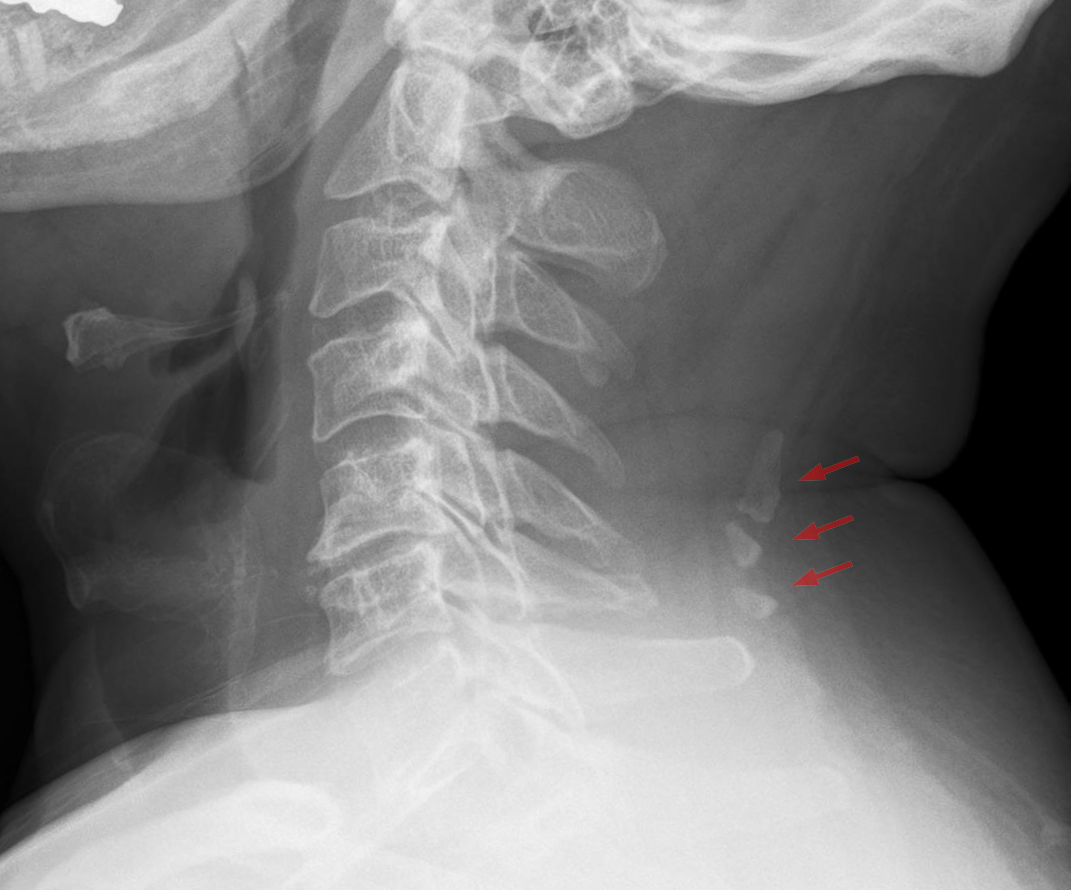
Bone tissue in the nuchal ligament.

=== Neck ===
- Nodules in the posterior margin of the nuchal ligament form bone tissue in approximately 11% of males and 3–5% in females after the third decade of life, and may then be regarded to be sesamoid bones.

=== Shoulder ===
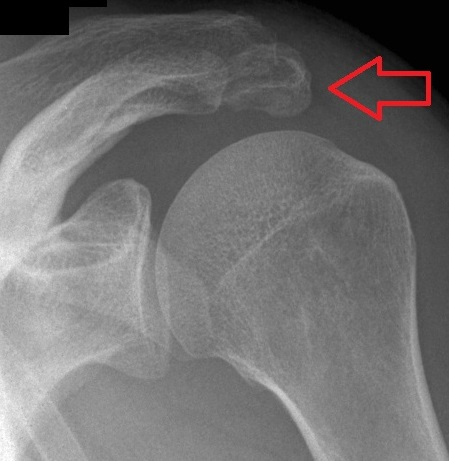
Os acromiale.

- An os acromiale forms when any of its four ossification centers fail to fuse. These four ossification centers are called (from tip to base) pre-acromion, meso-acromion, meta-acromion, and basi-acromion. In most cases, the first three fuse at 15–18 years, whereas the base part fuses to the scapular spine at 12 years. Such failure to fuse occurs in between 1% and 15% of cases. It rarely causes pain.

=== Vertebral column ===
- An Oppenheimer ossicle is found in approximately 4% (range 1–7%) of individuals. It is associated with the facet joints of lumbar spines. It usually occurs as a single, unilateral ossicle at the inferior articular processes, but can also occur at the superior articular processes.

=== Knee ===
- The fabella is present in 10% to 30% of individuals.

== See also ==
- Accessory muscle
