= Sesamoiditis =

- Sesamoid bones in the human foot
- Specialty: Orthopedics
- Symptoms: inflammation and pain on the bottom of feet
- Causes: inflammation of the sesamoid bones

Sesamoiditis is inflammation of the sesamoid bones.

== Humans ==
Sesamoiditis occurs on the bottom of the foot, just behind the big toe. There are normally two sesamoid bones on each foot; sometimes sesamoids can be bipartite, which means they each comprise two separate pieces. The sesamoids are roughly the size of jelly beans. The sesamoid bones act as a fulcrum for the flexor tendons, the tendons which bend the big toe downward.

Symptoms include inflammation and pain.

Sometimes a sesamoid bone is fractured. This can be difficult to pick up on X-ray, so a bone scan or MRI is a better alternative.

Among those who are susceptible to the malady are dancers, catchers and pitchers in baseball, soccer players, and American football players.

== Horses ==
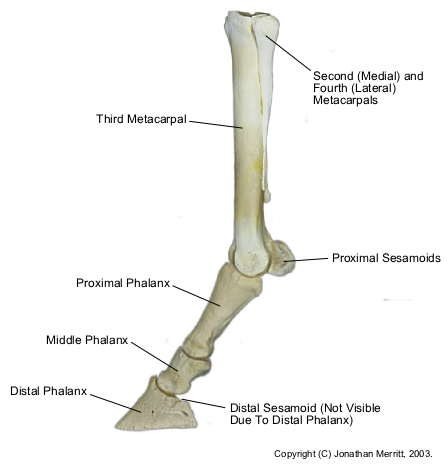
Location of the sesamoid bones, behind the fetlock.

In the horse it occurs at the horse's fetlock. The sesamoid bones lie behind the bones of the fetlock, at the back of the joint, and help to keep the tendons and ligaments that run between them correctly functioning.

Usually periostitis (new bone growth) occurs along with sesamoiditis, and the suspensory ligament may also be affected. Sesamoiditis results in inflammation, pain, and eventually bone growth.

== Causes ==
In humans, excessive forces caused by sudden bending upwards of the big toe, high heels, or a stumble can contribute to sesamoiditis. Once the sesamoid bone is injured it can be very difficult to cure, because additional pressure is put on the sesamoid bone during walking.

== Treatment ==
Treatment in humans consists of anti-inflammatory medication, cortisone injections, strapping to immobilize the big toe, and orthotics with special accommodations to keep pressure off the affected bone.

In horses, sesamoiditis is generally caused by excess stress on the fetlock joint. Conformation that promotes sesamoiditis include long pasterns, or horses with long toes and low heels.

== Notable cases ==
- Josh Zeid, major league baseball pitcher
- Melvin Upton, major league baseball player
- JJ O'Donnell, football player for Gateshead FC
