= Fabella =

Accessory bone behind the lateral condyle of the femur

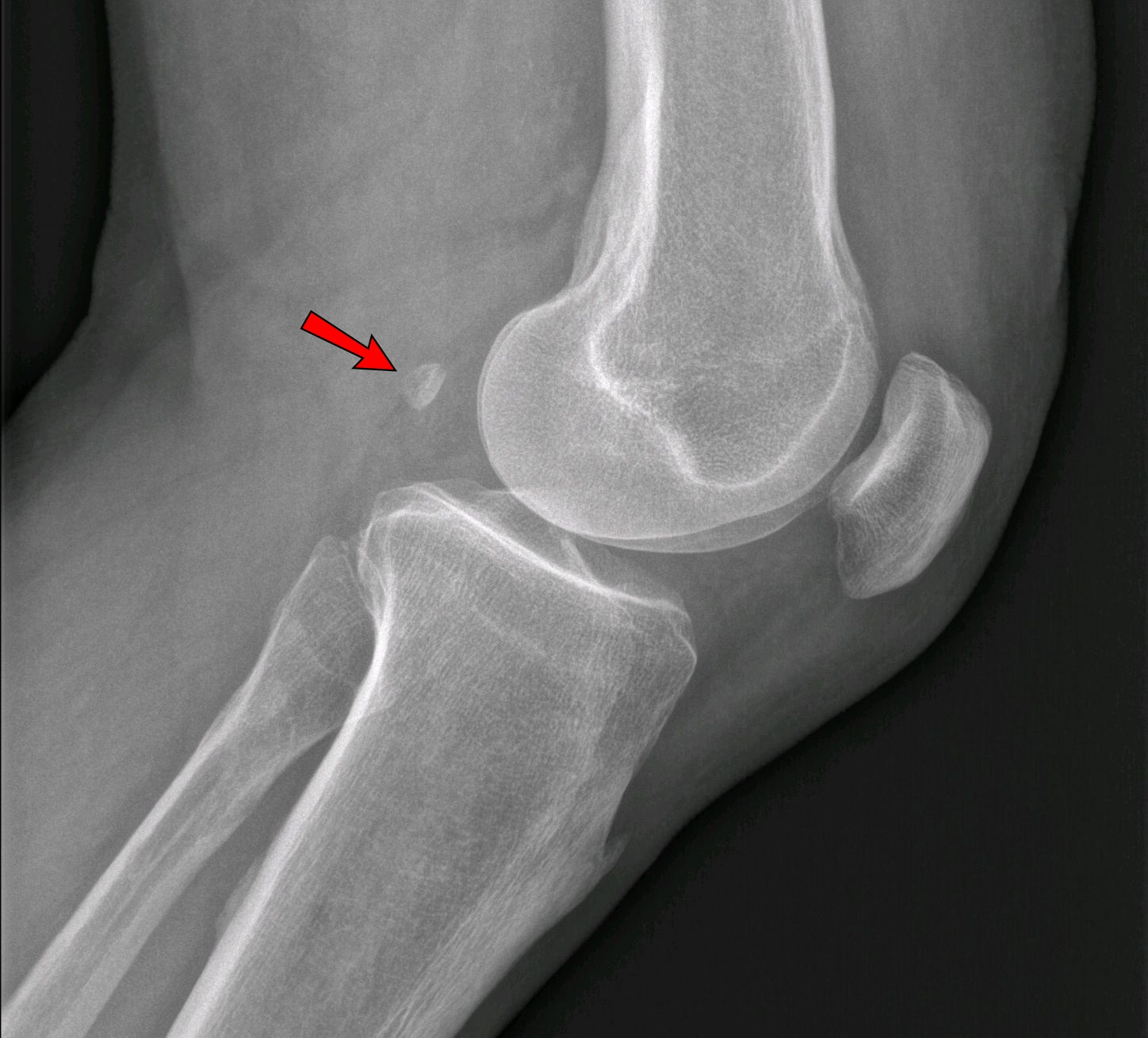

Details

Identifiers
- Latin: os fabella
- TA2: 1395
- FMA: 281591

The fabella is a small sesamoid bone found in some mammals embedded in the tendon of the lateral head of the gastrocnemius muscle behind the lateral condyle of the femur. It is an accessory bone, an anatomical variation present in 39% of humans. Rarely, there are two or three of these bones (fabella bi- or tripartita). It can be mistaken for a loose body or osteophyte. The word fabella is a Latin diminutive of faba 'bean'.

In humans, it is more common in men than women, older individuals compared to younger, and there is high regional variation, with fabellae being most common in people living in Asia and Oceania and least common in people living in North America and Africa. Bilateral cases (one per knee) are more common than unilateral ones (one per individual), and within individual cases, fabellae are equally likely to be present in right or left knees. Taken together, these data suggest the ability to form a fabella may be genetically controlled, but fabella ossification may be environmentally controlled.

Although the fabella seems to have disappeared with the evolution of Hominidae, it reappeared in humans sometime after they diverged from chimpanzees. It is unknown whether it reappeared soon after this divergence, 5–7 million years ago, or more recently in human evolution. The re-emergence of the lateral fabella may be correlated with "straight-legged, bipedal locomotion" in humans.

The fabella can lead to posterolateral knee pain either due to cartilage softening (chondromalacia fabellae) or other osteoarthritic changes on its articular surface."

== See also ==
- Fabella sign – Pattern seen in radiologic examinations
