= Sesamoid bone =

Bone embedded within a tendon or muscle, functioning as a biomechanical advantage

- Sesamoid bones at the distal end of the first metatarsal bone of the foot.

Details

Identifiers
- Latin: os sesamoideum; pl. ossa sesamoidea
- MeSH: D012716
- TA98: A02.0.00.016
- TA2: 374
- FMA: 32672

In anatomy, a sesamoid bone (/ˈsɛsəmɔɪd/) is a bone embedded within a tendon or a muscle. Its name is derived from the Greek word for 'sesame seed', indicating the small size of most sesamoids. Often, these bones form in response to strain, or can be present as a normal variant. The patella is the largest sesamoid bone in the body. Sesamoids act like pulleys, providing a smooth surface for tendons to slide over, increasing the tendon's ability to transmit muscular forces.

== Structure ==
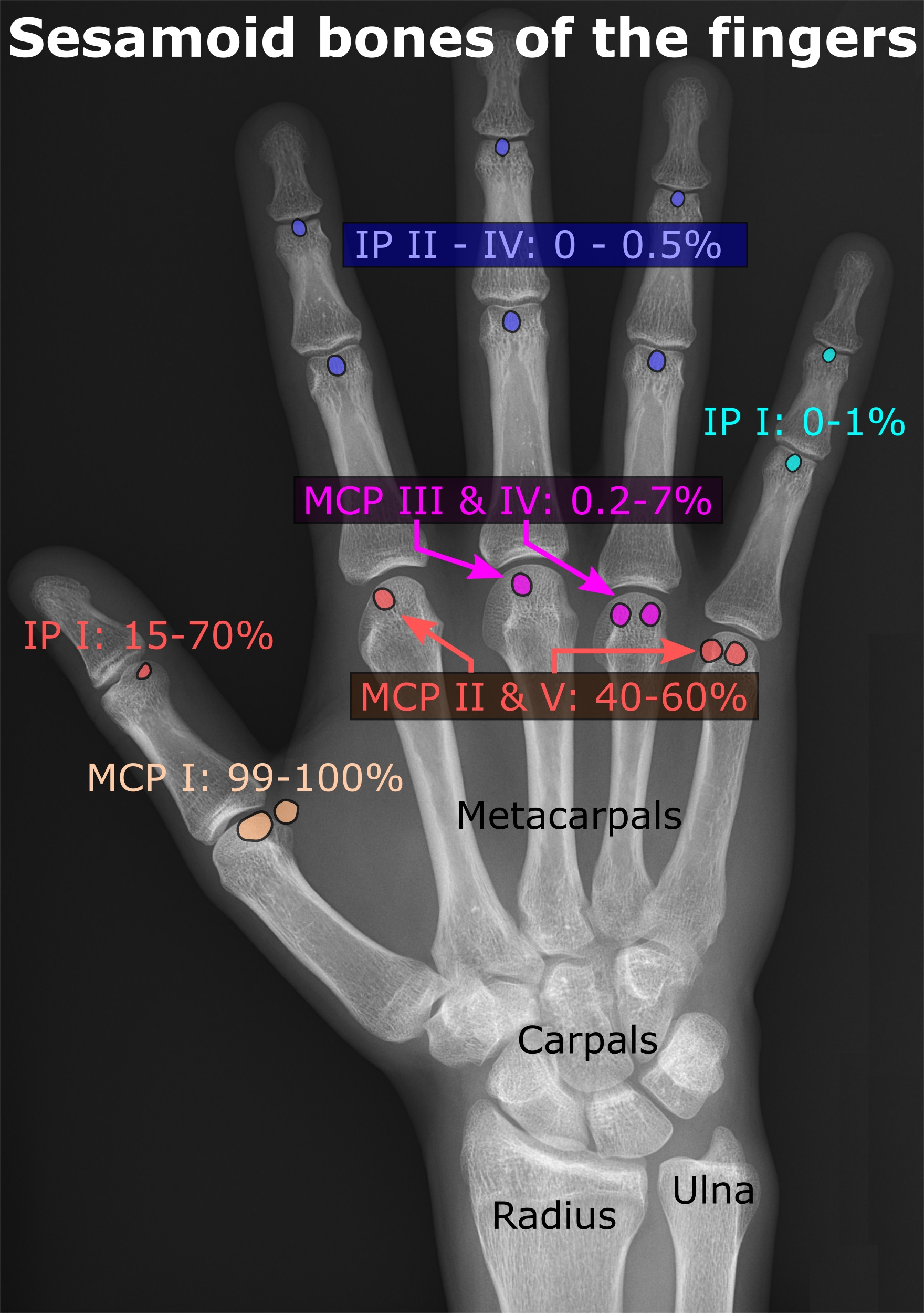
Prevalence, structure, and locations of sesamoid bones of the hand.

Sesamoid bones can be found on joints throughout the human body, including:

- In the knee—the patella (within the quadriceps tendon). This is the largest sesamoid bone.
- In the hand—two sesamoid bones are commonly found in the distal portions of the first metacarpal bone (within the tendons of adductor pollicis and flexor pollicis brevis). There is also commonly a sesamoid bone in distal portions of the second metacarpal bone and fifth metacarpal bone.
- In the wrist—The pisiform of the wrist is a sesamoid bone (within the tendon of flexor carpi ulnaris). It begins to ossify in children ages 9–12.
- In the foot—the first metatarsal bone usually has two sesamoid bones at its connection to the big toe (both within the tendon of flexor hallucis brevis). One is found on the lateral side of the first metatarsal while the other is found on the medial side. In some people, only a single sesamoid is found on the first metatarsal bone.

== Common variants ==
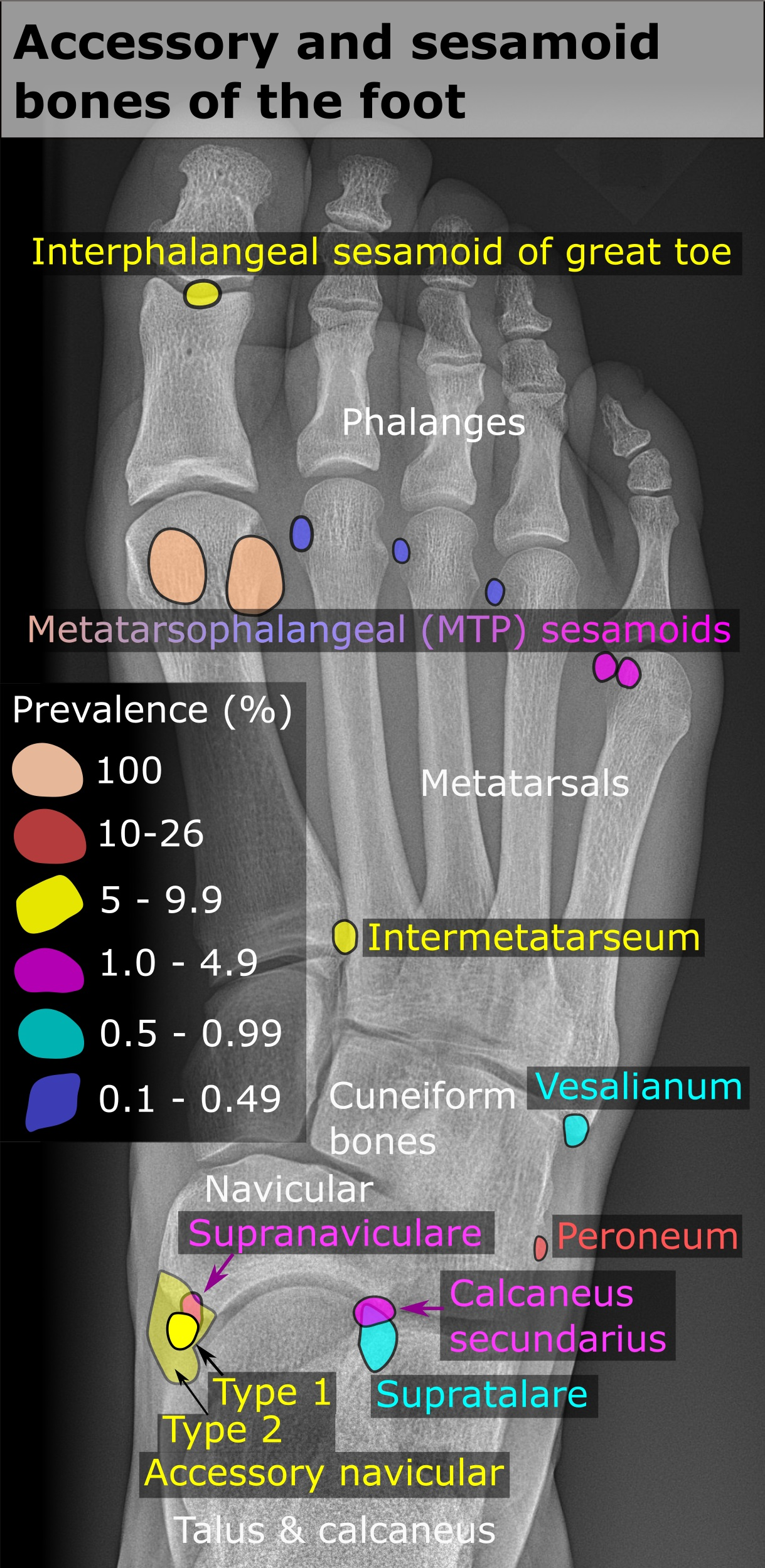
X-ray of the foot by dorsoplantar view, with most common accessory and sesamoid bones.

Accessory sesamoid bones are often occur as anatomical variation, which may be present in many different body regions. The differentiation from avulsion fractures and post-traumatic changes is very important. Kunc's criteria for accessory sesamoid bones are: 1) regular margin, 2) ovoid shape, 3) regular cortical-to-medullary ratio..

- One or both of the sesamoid bones under the first metatarsophalangeal joint (of the great toe) can be multipartite – in two or three parts (mostly bipartite – in two parts).
- The fabella is a small sesamoid bone found in some mammals embedded in the tendon of the lateral head of the gastrocnemius muscle behind the lateral condyle of the femur. It is a variant of normal anatomy and present in humans in 10% to 30% of individuals. The fabella can also be mutipartite or bipartite.
- The cyamella is a small sesamoid bone embedded in the tendon of the popliteus muscle. It is a variant of normal anatomy. It is rarely seen in humans, but has been described more often in other primates and certain other animals.
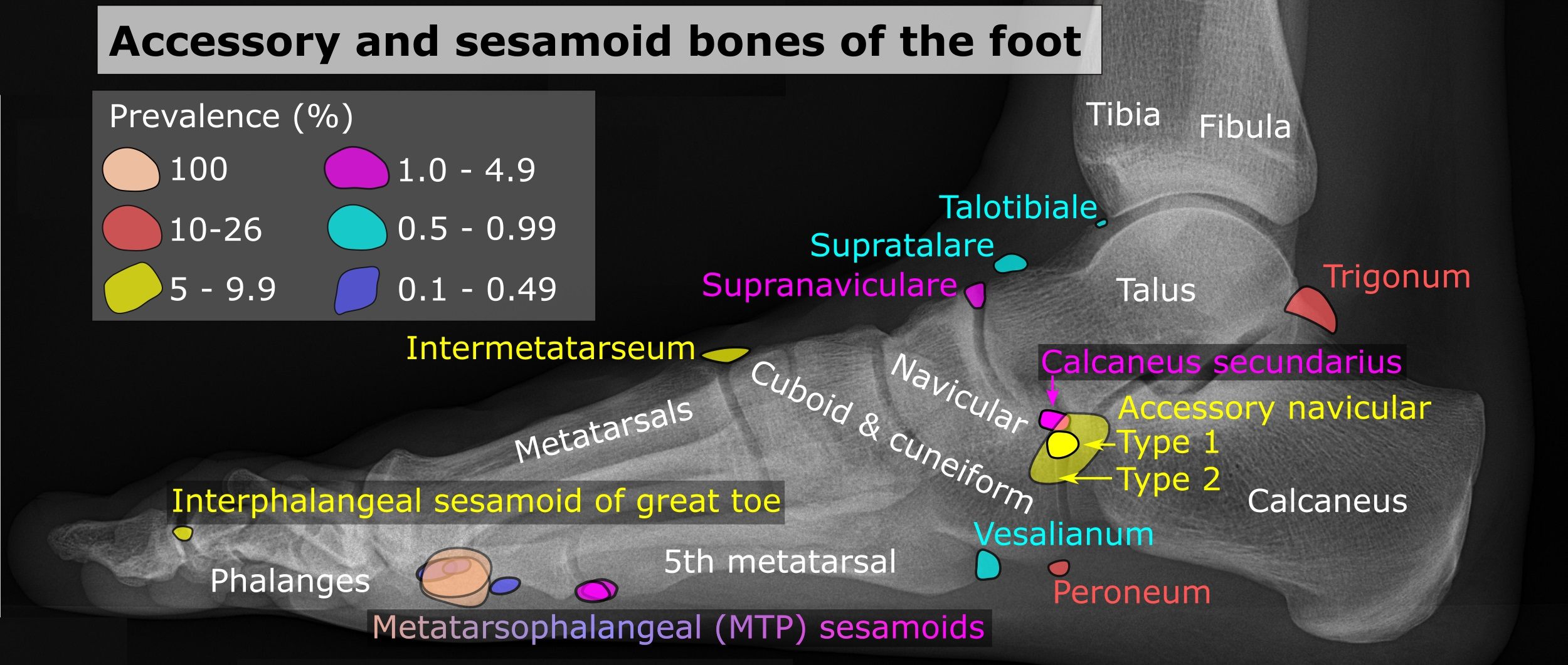
Lateral view.

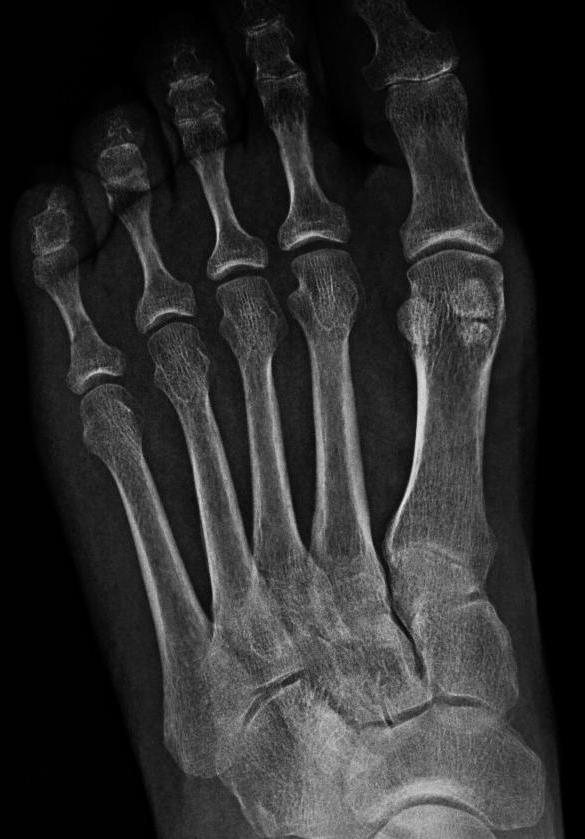
Bipartite medial sesamoid bone under the first metatarsophalangeal joint of the great toe of the left foot of an adult woman.

== Clinical significance ==
- A common foot ailment in dancers is sesamoiditis (an inflammation of the sesamoid bones under the first metatarsophalangeal joint of the big toe). This is a form of tendinitis which results from the tendons surrounding the sesamoid becoming inflamed or irritated.
- Sesamoid bones generally have a very limited blood supply, rendering them prone to avascular necrosis (bone death from lack of blood supply), which is very difficult to treat.

== Other animals ==
In equine anatomy, the term sesamoid bone usually refers to the two sesamoid bones found at the back of the fetlock or metacarpophalangeal and metatarsophalangeal joints in both hindlimbs and forelimbs. Strictly these should be termed the proximal sesamoid bones whereas the navicular bone should be referred to as the distal sesamoid bone. The patella is also a form of sesamoid bone in the horse.

Although many carnivores have radial sesamoid bones, the giant panda and red panda independently evolved to have an enlarged radial sesamoid bone. This evolution has caused the two species to diverge from other carnivores. The red panda likely originally evolved the "pseudo-thumb" in order to assist in arboreal locomotion. When the red panda later evolved to consume a bamboo diet, the enlarged bone underwent exaptation to assist in grasping bamboo. The giant panda, however, evolved the enlarged radial sesamoid bone around the same time as it evolved a bamboo diet. In the giant panda, the bone allows for a pincer-like motion and is used in grasping the bamboo. In these two panda species, DYNC2H1 gene and PCNT gene have been identified as possible causes for the pseudo-thumb development.

Recently, the enlarged radial sesamoid bone of cotton rats has been studied. Their enlarged radial sesamoid bone and that of the giant panda have a similar morphology and size relative to the rest of the hand. The reason for this evolutionary change is still unknown; however, it may be to assist in grasping small objects and thin branches.

Elephants have similarly enlarged sesamoid bones in both their forelimbs and hindlimbs, referred to as the prepollex and prehallux, respectively. These sesamoids function as "sixth toes", helping to distribute the animals' weight. In contrast to other sesamoids in elephants, which ossify at three to seven years of age, the ossification of the prepollex and prehallux is delayed and is known to not have yet occurred in animals in excess of 20 years of age. The prehallux is further divided into two elements; the more proximal of these is fixed, whilst the more distal is mobile. Evidence of these "predigits" has also been found in certain fossil proboscideans.

The forepaws of moles also possess a prepollex consisting of an enlarged, sickle-shaped sesamoid.

== See also ==
- Accessory bone – Additional bone found in some people
- Sesamoiditis
