= Stieda process =

Elongated lateral tubercle of the talus

A stieda process refers to an elongated lateral posterior tubercle of the talus.
