= Bryan Danielson =

American retired professional wrestler (born 1981)

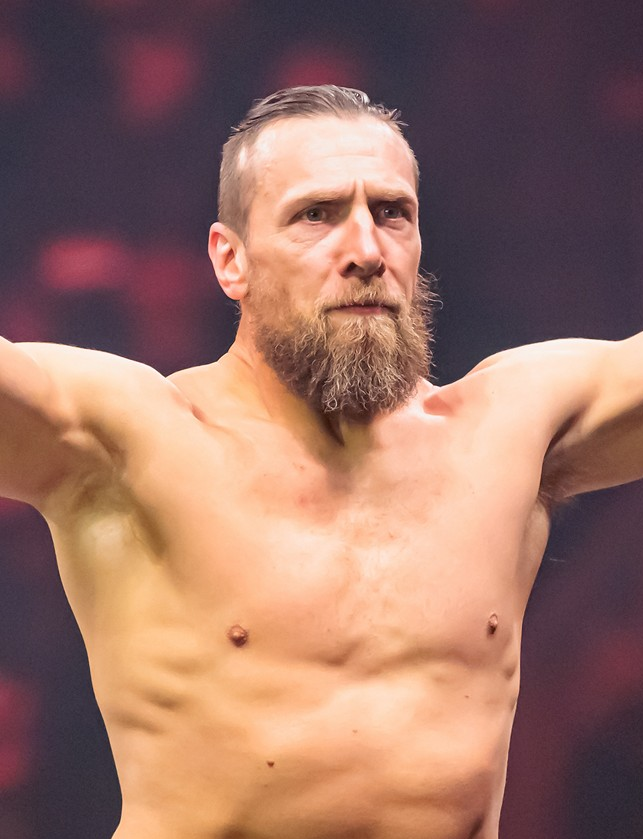
- Danielson in 2022

Personal information
- Born: Bryan Lloyd Danielson; May 22, 1981 (age 45) Aberdeen, Washington, U.S.
- Spouse: Brie Bella (m. 2014)
- Children: 2
- Relative: Nikki Bella (sister-in-law)

Professional wrestling career
- Ring name(s): American Dragon; Bryan Danielson; Daniel Bryan; Daniel Wyatt; Dynamic Dragon; Infinito
- Billed height: 5 ft 10 in (178 cm)
- Billed weight: 210 lb (95 kg)
- Billed from: Aberdeen, Washington
- Trained by: Professional wrestling: Rudy Gonzalez; Shawn Michaels; Texas Wrestling Academy; Bobby Eaton; Tracy Smothers; William Regal; Memphis Championship Wrestling; Antonio Inoki; Inoki Dojo; Submission grappling: Neil Melanson; Xtreme Couture
- Debut: October 4, 1999

Bryan Lloyd Danielson (born May 22, 1981) is an American professional wrestler. He is signed to All Elite Wrestling (AEW), where he mainly serves as a color commentator for its flagship show Dynamite while also making sporadic in-ring appearances. He is also known for his tenure in WWE, where he performed under the ring name Daniel Bryan from 2010 to 2021.

Born in Aberdeen, Washington, Danielson began his professional wrestling career in 1999 on the independent circuit, and signed an 18-month contract with the World Wrestling Federation (WWF, now WWE) in 2000; he later went on to make appearances in WWE until 2003. He joined Ring of Honor (ROH) in 2002, wrestling in the main event of the promotion's first event. Danielson stayed with the company until 2009, winning the ROH World Championship and ROH Pure Championship once each. He unified the championships at one point and was also the inaugural winner of the annual ROH Survival of the Fittest tournament. In 2022, he was named as part of the inaugural class of the ROH Hall of Fame. He also wrestled extensively in Japan, winning the GHC Junior Heavyweight Championship in Pro Wrestling Noah (Noah) and the IWGP Junior Heavyweight Tag Team Championship in New Japan Pro-Wrestling (NJPW). He won numerous titles on the independent circuit, including the PWG World Championship, the FIP Heavyweight Championship, and the wXw World Heavyweight Championship.

Danielson again signed with WWE in 2009, but was fired after an incident in 2010. Upon his return three months later, he went on to win the WWE Championship four times, (Note: Bryan's third reign was as WWE World Heavyweight Champion.) the World Heavyweight Championship once, and the WWE United States Championship and WWE Intercontinental Championship once each. He also won the WWE Tag Team Championship (as part of Team Hell No with Kane) and the SmackDown Tag Team Championship (with Erick Rowan), becoming the 26th WWE Triple Crown Champion and the 15th WWE Grand Slam Champion. He also won the 2011 SmackDown Money in the Bank ladder match and the "Superstar of the Year" award at the 2013 Slammy Awards, and headlined several major WWE events, including WWE's flagship event, WrestleMania, twice (30 and 37 – Night 2).

Danielson initially retired from professional wrestling in 2016 due to injuries arising from multiple concussions, which led to seizures and a brain lesion. He then took on a non-wrestling role for WWE as the on-screen general manager of SmackDown and remained in the role until 2018, when he was unexpectedly cleared by doctors to return to in-ring competition. His WWE contract expired in May 2021, and he made his AEW debut four months later. Since joining AEW, he has headlined several AEW pay-per-view events and won the men's 2024 Owen Hart Cup. He defeated Swerve Strickland to become the AEW World Champion at All In 2024, his first championship in the promotion. At WrestleDream 2024, Danielson lost the AEW World Championship to Jon Moxley in what was billed as the final match of his full-time professional wrestling career.

== Early life ==
Bryan Lloyd Danielson was born in Aberdeen, Washington, on May 22, 1981, the son of therapist Darlene and lumberjack Donald "Buddy" Danielson (d. 2014). His mother was pregnant with him for over 10 months. He has an older sister named Billie Sue. His father's job moved the family to Vernal, Utah, then to Albany, Oregon, before they returned to Aberdeen. His parents divorced over his father's alcoholism when Danielson was a child, though they remained on good terms.

During his childhood, Danielson was shown a professional wrestling magazine by a friend, and has been a fan of wrestling ever since. He considered himself shy and antisocial as a child and teenager, but still competed in sports such as football and track and field. To help his mother support the family after his parents' divorce, he and his sister both delivered newspapers as children, and later worked at McDonald's as teenagers. For a brief time in high school, he lived with his father in Castle Rock, Washington.

== Professional wrestling career ==
=== Early career (1999–2000) ===
During his sophomore year at Aberdeen High School, Danielson decided to pursue a professional wrestling career and attempted to train at Dean Malenko's wrestling school in Florida; however, by the time he graduated in 1999, the school had closed down. Following a friend's suggestion, he instead began training under Shawn Michaels and Rudy Gonzalez at the Texas Wrestling Academy (TWA) in San Antonio, Texas. After his wrestling debut in December 1999, he toured Japan with Frontier Martial-Arts Wrestling (FMW) alongside Lance Cade, a fellow trainee from the TWA, and they competed in several tag team matches. He won the TWA Tag Team Championship with Spanky on March 21, 2000, defeating The Board of Education (Jeromy Sage and Ruben Cruz), but they dropped the titles back to The Board of Education two weeks later.

=== World Wrestling Federation/World Wrestling Entertainment (2000–2003) ===
While touring the country's independent circuit, Danielson was signed to a developmental deal by the World Wrestling Federation (WWF) to work in their developmental system and was assigned to Memphis Championship Wrestling (MCW), where he gained exposure and was trained by WWF competitor William Regal, whom he credited as being instrumental in the development of his career. During this time, he adopted his moniker of the "American Dragon". The WWF severed its ties with MCW in 2001, but not before Danielson won the MCW Light Heavyweight Championship and the MCW Tag Team Championship with Spanky. After 18 months with the company, he was released from his WWF contract in July 2001. Danielson revealed in his 2015 autobiography that he was close to being called up to the main roster during the 2001 Royal Rumble match; he explained that the WWF thought of using him as one of their key figures in the newly created cruiserweight division, which was inspired by World Championship Wrestling (WCW).

In 2002, Danielson wrestled two matches for the renamed World Wrestling Entertainment (WWE) despite not being a contracted performer for the company. He was quickly defeated by both Sean O'Haire and Little Guido in his two appearances. He went on to make four additional non-contracted appearances for WWE in 2003 on its secondary shows, Velocity and Heat, initially as enhancement talent before being allowed to compete in longer matches; he wrestled Jamie Noble at a Velocity taping in January, Rico at a Heat taping in February, John Cena at a Velocity taping also in February, and made his final appearance in November in a tag team match against Paul London and Spanky at a Velocity taping, in which he was partnered with John Walters. This was his final appearance for the promotion for over five years.

=== New Japan Pro-Wrestling (2001–2004) ===
Danielson went to Japan after his release from the WWF, competing in Japan's premier promotion, New Japan Pro-Wrestling (NJPW), where he used his American Dragon persona and donned a red, white and blue mask reminiscent of a dragon. As a part of the junior heavyweight division, Danielson had success in both singles and tag team competition in the company, winning (without wearing a mask) the IWGP Junior Heavyweight Tag Team Championship with Curry Man on March 12, 2004.

=== Ring of Honor (2002–2009) ===
==== Founding father (2002–2005) ====
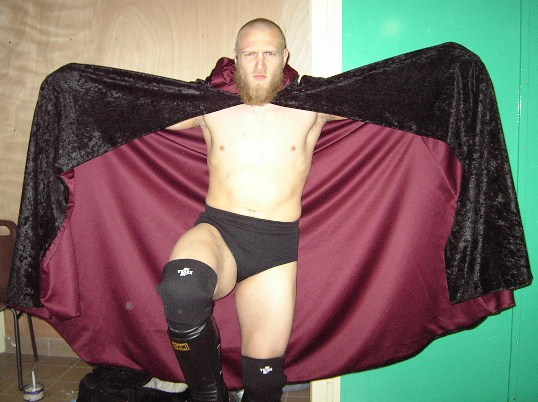
Danielson posing in 2004

In 2002, Danielson joined the independent promotion Ring of Honor (ROH), where he is acknowledged as a "Founding Father" of the company. On February 23, 2002, he competed in the main event of the company's debut event, The Era of Honor Begins, in a three-way match against Christopher Daniels and Low Ki, a match that Low Ki won. One of his matches with Austin Aries, performed on August 7, 2004, at Testing the Limit, lasted seventy-four minutes before Aries was finally declared the victor. One of the more notable rivalries he had in the early years in the company was with Homicide, as the two fought numerous matches with a variety of stipulations, culminating in a steel cage match on May 13, 2005, at The Final Showdown, where Danielson was victorious.

Despite winning the company's inaugural Survival of the Fittest tournament in 2004, Bryan did not win a ROH title. In 2005, Danielson explained in the company's newsletter, The ROH Newswire, that he had quit ROH after being frustrated by his inability to defeat Austin Aries for the ROH World Championship. It was later revealed Danielson had become frustrated in general with professional wrestling and planned to take some time off to evaluate his career options. However, Danielson had several dates booked in Europe and Japan, leading fans to believe that the periodical was likely a storyline claim for Danielson's absence during this period.

==== ROH World Champion (2005–2006) ====
Danielson defeated James Gibson for the ROH World Championship at Glory by Honor IV on September 15, 2005. The rest of the year saw Danielson have successful title defenses even against wrestlers from other companies, such as Pro Wrestling Noah star Naomichi Marufuji at Final Battle on December 17. At the beginning of 2006, Chris Hero, a representative from Combat Zone Wrestling (CZW), invaded ROH and targeted Danielson—the two exchanged words over the internet before having a match together, with nearly the entire roster of both companies embarking on an interpromotional feud. Danielson became personally invested in this feud and invaded CZW himself, which led to him having physical altercations with a number of CZW wrestlers. Hero intensified the rivalry, leading to the two wrestling at ROH's Hell Freezes Over event on January 14, where Danielson successfully defended the ROH World Championship. On July 15 at Death Before Dishonor IV, he soon filled the vacant slot on ROH's five-man team which participated in one of CZW's more popular attractions, a steel cage match called the Cage of Death, a ten-man tag team match in which a man from each team starts in the cage and a random wrestler enters periodically thereafter. During the match, Danielson turned on his team by assaulting his rival Samoa Joe before leaving the match and effectively abandoning his involvement in the animosity between the two promotions. As the interpromotional hostility with CZW heightened, Danielson also defended against challengers from the rival company, who had signed an open contract for any CZW wrestler willing to challenge for the ROH World Championship. Former champion Samoa Joe also challenged Danielson at Fight of the Century on August 5, but their match ended in a 60-minute draw.

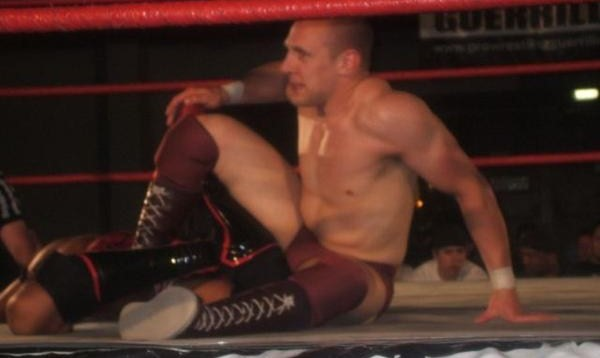
Danielson in the ring in 2006

While having the ROH World Championship, ROH faced the issue of having another title with seemingly equal value, the ROH Pure Championship. Danielson and the ROH Pure Champion Nigel McGuinness had a match to unify the titles. They met at April 29 in a match fought under pure wrestling rules and McGuinness left Danielson outside the ring after a chair shot to win by countout—this was enough to retain the Pure title, but not to win Danielson's World Championship. They had another unification match in McGuinness's native England; ROH decided that there had to be a winner, with a title changing hands by countout and disqualification and a draw forcing a restart. Danielson won the match on August 12 and retired the Pure title as its last champion (the title would be reinstated in 2020). During a match with Colt Cabana on August 26, Danielson suffered a real injury when he separated his shoulder, tearing two tendons in it and he tore another tendon in his chest. Danielson returned at Glory by Honor V: Night 2 on September 16 and was challenged by Kenta, a guest competitor from NOAH, due to the two companies' talent exchange agreement—Danielson again retained his championship. At Final Battle on December 23, Danielson's fifteen-month title reign finally ended after he lost to Homicide at his 39th defense and he subsequently took time off from wrestling in order to heal his shoulder.

==== Final feuds (2007–2009) ====
On May 11, 2007, Danielson returned to ROH at Reborn Again and defeated Shane Hagadorn and Adam Pearce in separate matches. On May 12, ROH filmed its first pay-per-view, Respect is Earned, which had Danielson team with ROH World Champion Takeshi Morishima against Nigel McGuinness and Kenta. Danielson's team won after Danielson made Kenta tap out to his signature submission hold, the Cattle Mutilation. Danielson vied to contend for the ROH World Championship by defeating McGuinness at Domination on June 9, which appeared on the company's next pay per view named Driven which took place on June 23, but was aired on September 21. This allowed him, now as a fan favorite, to challenge Morishima for the title at Manhattan Mayhem II on August 25 in a losing effort in which he also suffered a legitimate detached retina. Following surgery, he fought Morishima again in a match at Man Up on September 15, but the referee stopped the match since Danielson was unable to respond to him. In a rematch at Rising Above on December 29, Morishima was disqualified. Morishima returned to the company at Final Battle on December 27, 2008, in a match billed as a "Fight Without Honor" in which both men were allowed weapons and which Danielson won. Danielson commented in March 2012 on how he felt validated at Final Battle 2008, because he and Morishima managed to get 2,500 people to see the show in New York City.

As part of ROH's agreement with Pro Wrestling Noah, the company held a show in Japan named Tokyo Summit on September 14, where Danielson wrestled GHC Junior Heavyweight Champion Yoshinobu Kanemaru and won the championship. Following his victory, NOAH allowed him to defend the title in Ring of Honor, with his first defense being at Glory By Honor VII on September 20, defeating Katsuhiko Nakajima. However, this was his only successful defense as he returned to Japan on October 13 to lose the title to Kenta. Following his loss, Danielson challenged McGuinness for the ROH World Championship at the next ROH pay-per-view Rising Above on November 22, in a losing effort. Ring of Honor made its national television debut with the program Ring of Honor Wrestling and Danielson made his television debut in the main event of its third episode on February 28, 2009, by defeating Austin Aries.

In the fall of 2009, Danielson signed with WWE after a farewell tour with ROH, during which he challenged Aries for the title again and lost. On September 26 at Glory by Honor VIII: The Final Countdown, he won his last match in the company against McGuinness, who was also having his final match with the company until 2023.

=== Independent circuit (2003–2009) ===
Aside from competing primarily in ROH, Danielson has also competed in a multitude of other independent promotions, both in the United States and abroad. In 2003, he toured the United Kingdom for the British promotion All Star Wrestling (ASW), where he sometimes used the name Dynamic Dragon. While there, he won the World Heavy Middleweight Championship on May 6 in an eight-man one-night tournament in Croydon, defeating James Mason. He spent the next six months in the United Kingdom, working for ASW, Frontier Wrestling Alliance (FWA), the World Association of Wrestling (WAW), and Premier Promotions. He returned several times over the next five years, working for various promotions. In February 2005 at New Dawn Rising, he made his debut in ROH's sister promotion, Full Impact Pro (FIP), teaming up with Rocky Romero in a match against Austin Aries and Homicide. The next night at Dangerous Intentions, Danielson competed in a losing effort against CM Punk, which led to a brief feud between the two. Danielson's biggest success came in 2006 by winning the FIP Heavyweight Championship, holding the belt for eleven months before losing it to Roderick Strong. Danielson wrestled his last match for FIP in December 2006 at Florida Rumble, where he lost to Erick Stevens.

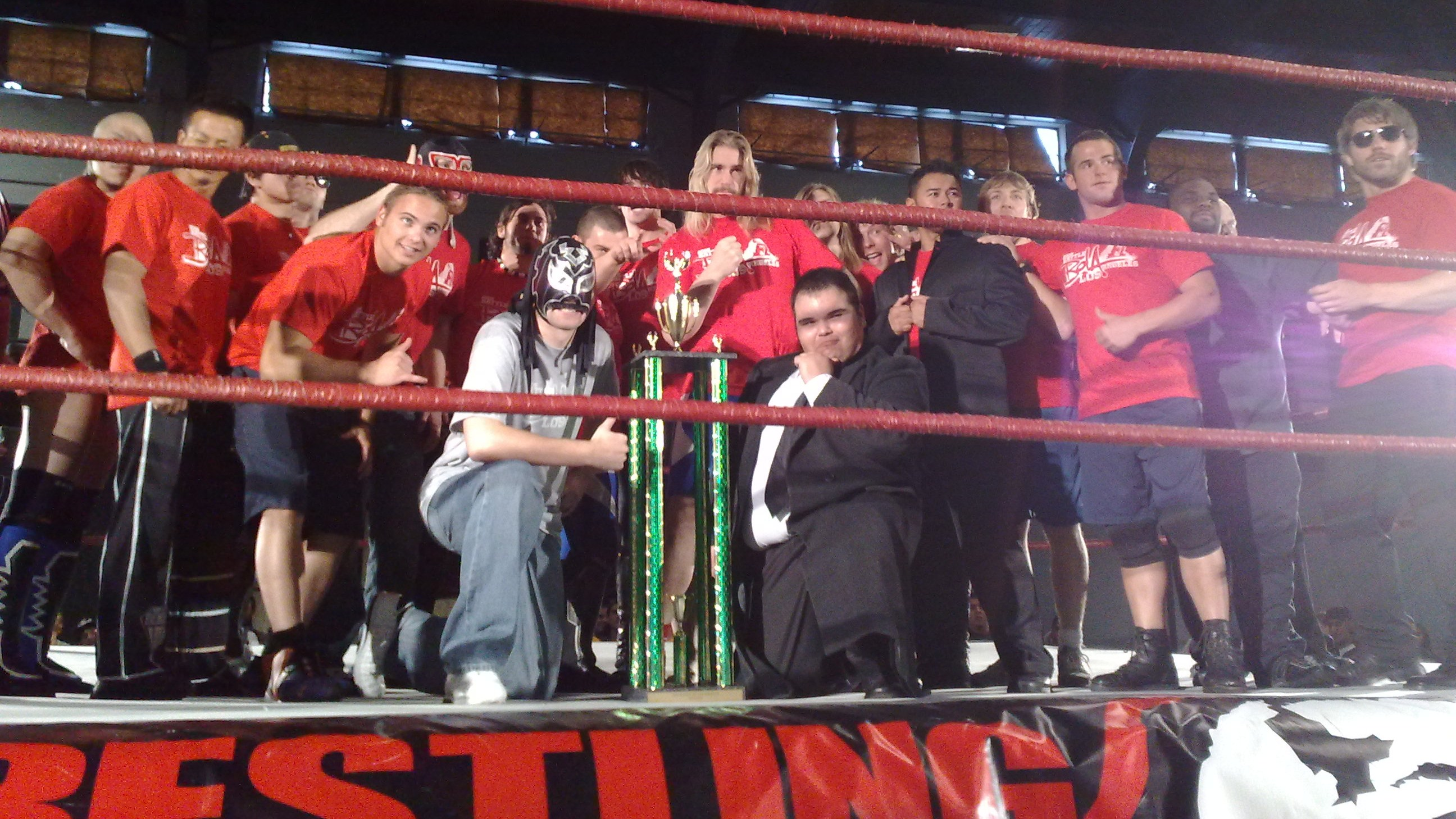
Danielson competed in PWG's annual Battle of Los Angeles tournament in 2008, losing in the semi-final to Chris Hero.

Danielson also wrestled in the Pro Wrestling Guerrilla (PWG) promotion. He made his debut in November 2003 at An Inch Longer Than Average in a losing effort to PWG Champion Frankie Kazarian. He continued to appear in PWG over the next couple of years, winning the PWG World Championship in 2007 and holding it for six months before taking an eleven-month hiatus from the company. He made his return to PWG at the 2008 Battle of Los Angeles tournament. In April 2009, at PWG: One Hundred, Danielson defeated Kenny Omega. The match was notable for its opening, which included Omega and Danielson performing variable tests of strength, including arm wrestling and a thumb war, before singing "John Jacob Jingleheimer Schmidt" along with the crowd. In May, he made another appearance teaming with Paul London, referring to himself as "American Dolphin" in a parodied manner. On September 4 at Guerre Sans Frontières during his last night in PWG, Danielson defeated Chris Hero to win the PWG World Championship for the second time and immediately vacated it afterward.

Following his return from his injury in 2007, the National Wrestling Alliance (NWA) published a video of Danielson stating his intent to challenge for the NWA World Heavyweight Championship, as the establishment that sanctioned the title at the time, Total Nonstop Action Wrestling, was relinquishing the title back to the NWA. A tournament, titled Reclaiming the Glory, was held to determine the new champion with Danielson making his way to finals, scheduled to compete Brent Albright on September 1, but due to the eye injury he sustained at ROH's Manhattan Mayhem event, he withdrew from the tournament and instead acted as the referee of the match.

In 2009, Danielson's contract with Ring of Honor expired, which opened up Danielson to travel to other companies more freely while competing in his home promotion. Also in 2009, Danielson signed a short-term contract with German wrestling promotion Westside Xtreme Wrestling (wXw). Shortly after his debut, Danielson won the wXw World Heavyweight Championship against Bad Bones and held it over a month before losing it to Absolute Andy. After his departure from wXw, Danielson made his debut with Philadelphia-based independent promotion CHIKARA to compete in their King of Trios tournament, which saw him team with Claudio Castagnoli and Dave Taylor in a contingency called Team Uppercut. In the same year, Danielson competed in Dragon Gate USA's second show, losing to Open the Dream Gate Champion Naruki Doi.

=== Return to WWE (2009–2010) ===
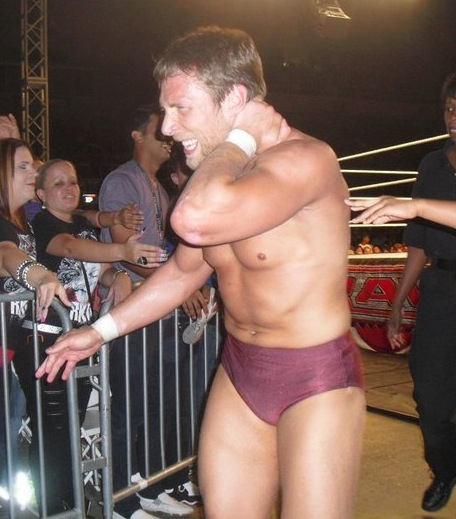
Bryan at a Raw house show in 2010

Danielson re-signed with WWE in August 2009, under his real name. He made his debut on January 4, 2010, in a dark match prior to Raw, defeating Chavo Guerrero. He went to Florida to train with Florida Championship Wrestling (FCW), the WWE developmental territory, to acclimate himself to his new work environment and work on his ring rust. He debuted at the FCW television tapings on January 14 and lost to Kaval. At the February 11 tapings, he was given the ring name Daniel Bryan. He later said that he was given a list of 10 possible ring names to use in WWE (including Daniel Bryan, Buddy Peacock, and Lloyd Bonaire) but his real name was not on the list. His name was given by William Regal.

Bryan made his debut on the inaugural episode of NXT on February 23, losing by submission to then World Heavyweight Champion Chris Jericho and being attacked by his storyline mentor The Miz for disrespecting him earlier in the show. He was eliminated from the show along with Michael Tarver. On the May 31 episode of Raw, Bryan was granted a match against The Miz by guest host Ashton Kutcher, which he won and threw Miz into Cole at ringside after the match. On the June 7 episode of Raw, the faction known as The Nexus (NXT rookies from season one) invaded the WWE ring, attacking John Cena and causing destruction around the ringside area. On June 11, Danielson was fired from WWE for being too violent during the segment, strangling ring announcer Justin Roberts with his own neck tie. Danielson noted that WWE apologized to him for his release, explaining that they "had sponsors they had to deal with". His release was put in a storyline, where the rest of the NXT rookies kicked him out of the group for showing remorse for his actions and declared that Bryan would never return to the WWE again.

=== Return to the independent circuit (2010) ===
After being released, Danielson received several offers to sign with other wrestling companies, being contacted by TNA, albeit indirectly and some Japanese promotions. Two weeks after his departure from WWE, Danielson made his return to the independent circuit on June 26, defeating Eddie Kingston at the CHIKARA event We Must Eat Michigan's Brain. Rather than receiving streamers, the fans instead threw neck ties in light of the Justin Roberts incident in WWE. The following day at CHIKARA's Faded Scars and Lines, Danielson defeated Young Lions Cup holder Tim Donst in a non-title match. On July 3, Danielson returned to wXw, defeating Wade Fitzgerald and TJP in the round robin stage of the Ambition 1 tournament. The following day, he defeated TJP in a rematch and finally Johnny Moss in the finals of the tournament to win Ambition 1. On July 17, Danielson debuted in the International Wrestling Association (IWA), being booked to defeat Q.T. Marshall for the IWA Puerto Rico Heavyweight Championship. On July 23, Danielson debuted in the fledgling EVOLVE promotion, which was originally conceived to be built around Danielson as their top star before he signed to WWE. In the main event, Danielson defeated Bobby Fish. The following day, Danielson returned to Dragon Gate USA and submitted Shingo in the dark match main event of Return of the Dragon. After the match, Danielson joined BxB Hulk, Masato Yoshino, Naruki Doi and PAC as the fifth member of the stable World-1. On July 30, Danielson returned to Pro Wrestling Guerrilla, competing in a match where he defeated Roderick Strong. On August 7, Danielson unsuccessfully challenged Adam Pearce for the NWA World Heavyweight Championship at the NWA Legends Fanfest.

Despite returning to WWE on August 15, Danielson honored most of his independent bookings, making his first appearance on August 20 and defeating Jon Moxley at Heartland Wrestling Association's Road to Destiny. The following day, he was defeated by Drake Younger at Insanity Pro Wrestling's Ninth Anniversary Reign of the Insane. On August 22, Danielson defeated J Freddie at a Squared Circle Wrestling event. On September 10, he returned to the IWA using the name Daniel Bryan and lost the IWA Puerto Rico Heavyweight Championship to Dennis Rivera. The following day, Danielson returned to EVOLVE by defeating Munenori Sawa in the main event. Later that same night, Danielson wrestled for New York Wrestling Connection in a tag team match, where he and Tony Nese defeated Dimitrios Papadon and Alex Reynolds. On September 25, Danielson returned to Dragon Gate USA and defeated YAMATO in the main event of the evening. The following day, Danielson defeated Jon Moxley. On October 1, Danielson wrestled the last of his independent matches by defeating Shelton Benjamin at a Northeast Wrestling event.

=== Second return to WWE (2010–2021) ===
"Ride of the Valkyries" (2:20)
Danielson's theme music
A 2022 recording, conducted by Philip Milman.

==== United States Champion (2010–2011) ====
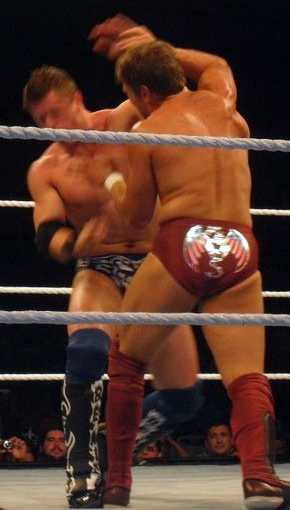
Bryan (right) wrestling his former NXT mentor, The Miz

Danielson returned to WWE as Daniel Bryan at SummerSlam on August 15, 2010, where he was revealed as the surprise seventh member of Team WWE for the seven-on-seven elimination tag team match against The Nexus. Bryan was one of the two final members of Team WWE and managed to eliminate two members of The Nexus, but was eliminated by Wade Barrett after The Miz, whose place he took in Team WWE, attacked him. Despite this, Team WWE won the match. As part of the Raw roster, Bryan feuded with The Miz, defeating him at Night of Champions on September 19 to win the United States Championship, his first championship in WWE.

Bryan then successfully defended the title two weeks later by defeating The Miz and John Morrison in a triple threat submissions count anywhere match at Hell in a Cell on October 3. At Bragging Rights on October 24, he went on to challenge then Intercontinental Champion Dolph Ziggler to a champion vs. champion match as a special attraction SmackDown vs. Raw match, defeating Ziggler. At Survivor Series on November 21, Bryan went on to successfully defend his title against Ted DiBiase. Bryan returned to NXT's season four as the Pro to Rookie Derrick Bateman.

In late 2010, The Bella Twins began competing for Bryan's affection, leading to them supporting him at ringside and competing in mixed tag team matches together. On the January 24, 2011, episode of Raw, it was revealed that Bryan had been secretly dating Gail Kim, who began accompanying him to ringside. On the March 14 episode of Raw, Bryan lost the United States Championship to Sheamus, ending his reign at 176 days. Bryan was originally scheduled to have his rematch against Sheamus for the United States Championship on the main card at WrestleMania XXVII on April 3, but the match was rescheduled as a dark lumberjack match that ended in a no contest when the lumberjacks fought among themselves to trigger the start of a battle royal, which he lost. Bryan lost his title rematch the next night on Raw, after which he was saved from Sheamus by the debuting Sin Cara.

On April 26, Bryan was drafted to the SmackDown brand as part of the 2011 supplemental draft. On the May 6 episode of SmackDown, Bryan made his debut for the brand by losing to Sheamus. Cody Rhodes then started a feud with Bryan by attacking him after losing their match and placing a paper bag on his head. Bryan then aligned with Sin Cara to feud with Cody Rhodes and Ted DiBiase. On June 28, Bryan returned to NXT to manage Derrick Bateman once again.

==== World Heavyweight Champion (2011–2012) ====
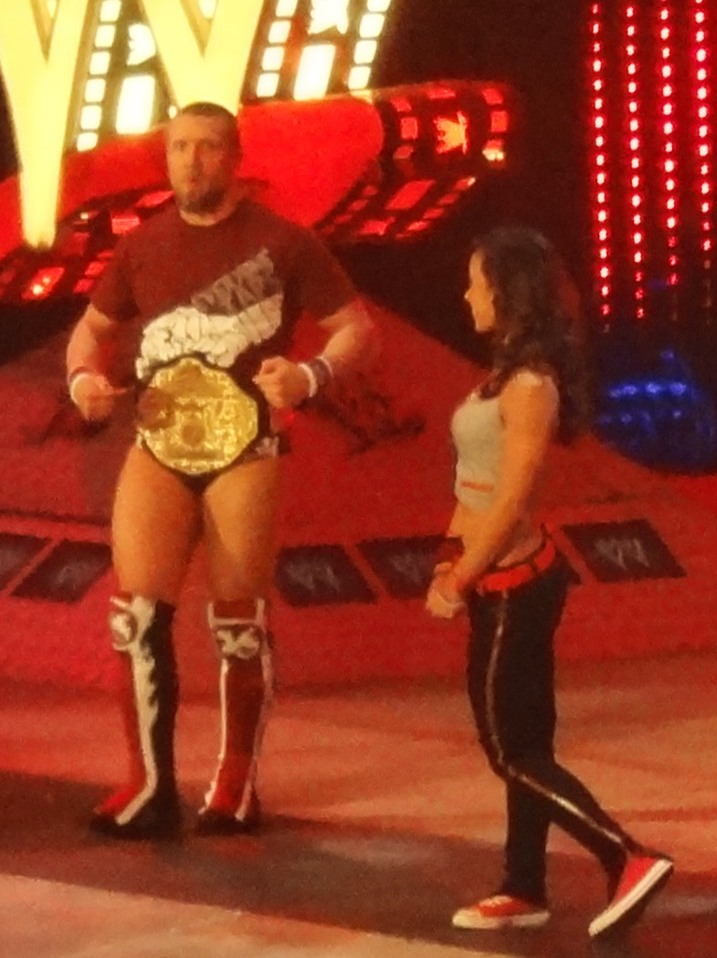
Bryan as World Heavyweight Champion alongside former on-screen girlfriend AJ Lee

On July 17 at Money in the Bank, Bryan won the SmackDown Money in the Bank ladder match which earned him a World Heavyweight Championship match at any point within the following year. After several months of losing matches, Bryan began a feud with then World Heavyweight Champion Mark Henry. On the November 25 episode of SmackDown, Henry was knocked out again by Big Show, at which point Bryan cashed in his briefcase for a title match and quickly pinned Henry, but SmackDown General Manager Theodore Long revealed that Henry was not medically cleared to compete and voided the match, so Henry remained champion and the briefcase was returned to Bryan. Regardless of his briefcase, Bryan won a fatal four-way match on the same episode of SmackDown to become the contender for Henry's championship. On the live November 29 episode of SmackDown, Henry managed to pin Bryan to retain the title in a steel cage match. Also in November, Bryan started being involved in a romantic storyline with AJ Lee.

Bryan cashed in his Money in the Bank contract on December 18 at TLC: Tables, Ladders and Chairs against Big Show, who had just defeated Henry and subsequently received a DDT onto a steel chair, which allowed Bryan to secure a pinfall victory and become the World Heavyweight Champion. As World Heavyweight Champion, Bryan turned heel when he developed an extremely over-confident personality.

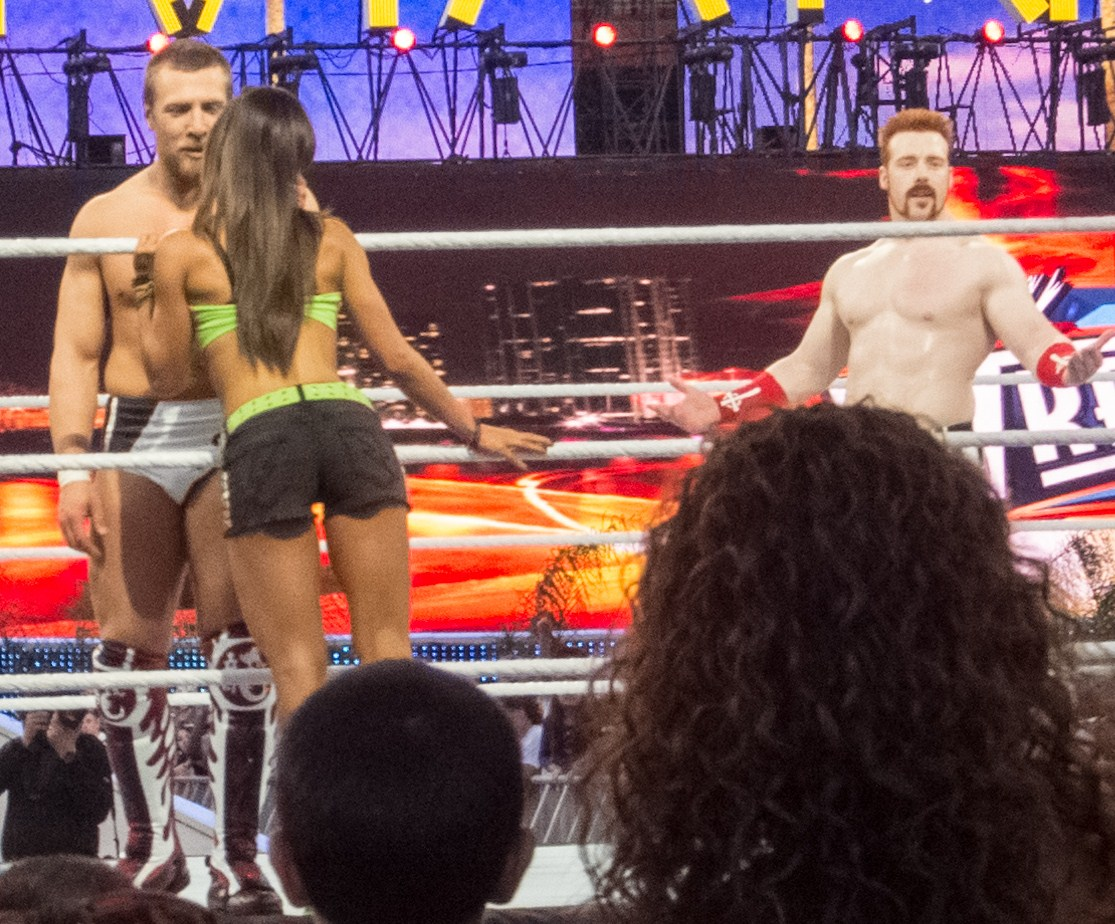
The kiss with AJ that cost Bryan his World Heavyweight Championship to Sheamus at WrestleMania XXVIII in 18 seconds

In January 2012, Bryan successfully defended his title three times: the first occasion against Big Show when Bryan goaded Mark Henry into attacking him and causing a disqualification; the second occasion a no disqualification rematch with Big Show which ended abruptly after Big Show accidentally ran into AJ, hospitalizing her within the storyline for which Bryan blamed him; and the third occasion against Henry in a lumberjack match when Bryan provoked the lumberjacks to interfere and cause a no contest. This culminated in a triple threat steel cage match to exclude outside interference at the Royal Rumble on January 29, where Bryan escaped the cage after freeing himself from Big Show's grasp to retain the championship.

At Elimination Chamber on February 19, Bryan defeated Big Show, Cody Rhodes, The Great Khali, Santino Marella, and Wade Barrett in an Elimination Chamber match to retain the World Heavyweight Championship. After the match, Royal Rumble match winner Sheamus attacked Bryan and chose him as his WrestleMania opponent for the World Heavyweight Championship. In March, Bryan began to mistreat AJ, publicly demanding her to shut up and claiming that she always got in his way. Despite these actions, AJ continued to stand by Bryan. Bryan's reign as World Heavyweight Champion ended at 105 days when Sheamus defeated him in 18 seconds at WrestleMania XXVIII on April 1 due to Bryan being distracted with receiving a good luck kiss from AJ. On the following episode of SmackDown, Bryan blamed AJ for his title loss and ended their relationship. Despite AJ's attempts to mend their relationship, Bryan cruelly rebuffed her multiple times, leaving AJ an emotional wreck. At Extreme Rules on April 29, Bryan failed to regain the World Heavyweight Championship from Sheamus in a two-out-of-three falls match, losing two falls to one.

==== Team Hell No (2012–2013) ====
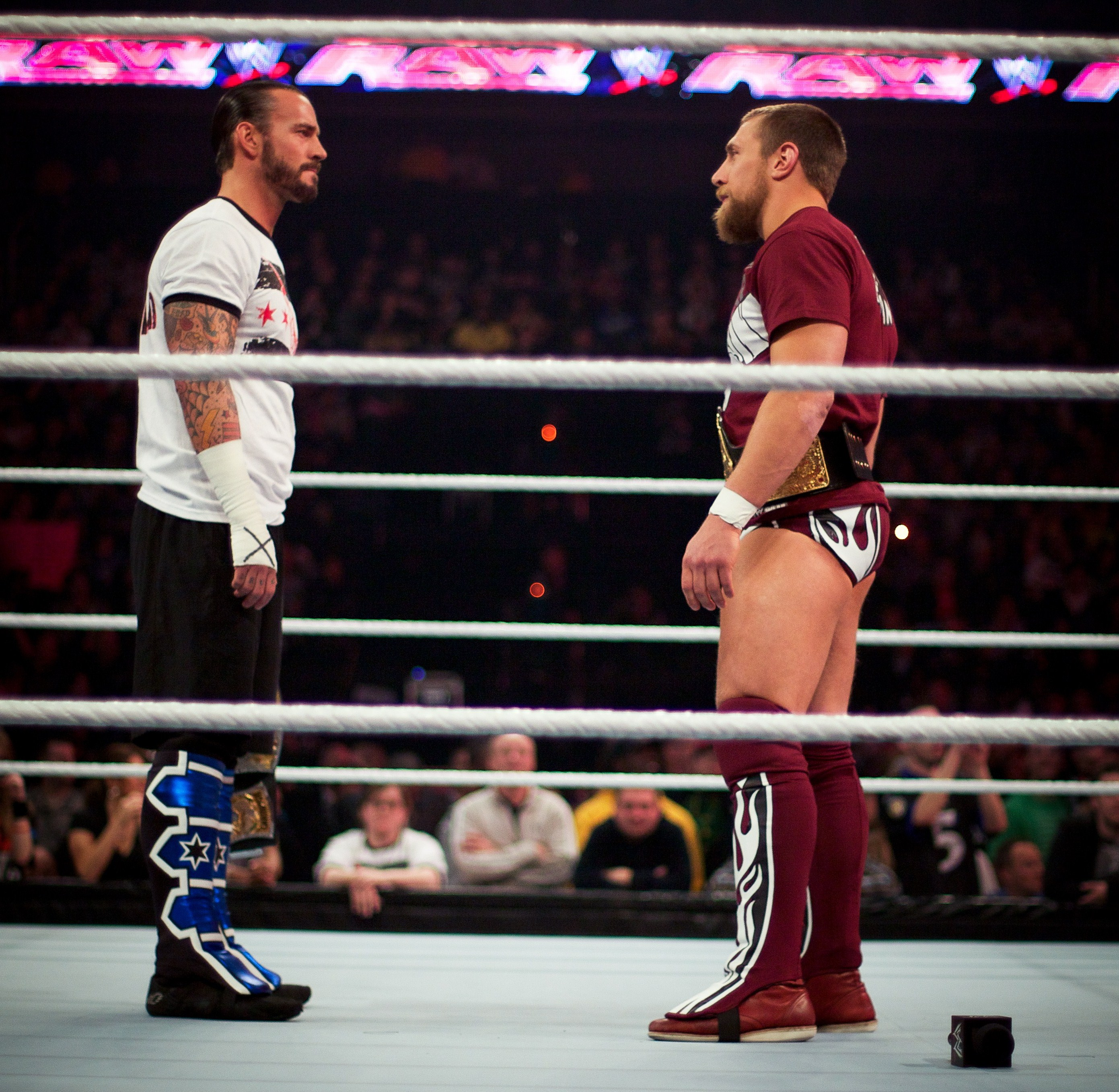
Bryan feuded with CM Punk for the WWE Championship in 2012 after losing the World Heavyweight Championship.

The next night on Raw SuperShow, Bryan became the number one contender to CM Punk's WWE Championship when he won a Beat the Clock challenge by defeating Jerry Lawler in under three minutes. Bryan received his title match at Over the Limit on May 20 and suffered a controversial loss—when Bryan rolled back onto his shoulders as he applied the "Yes!" Lock, Punk tapped out immediately after the referee counted a pinfall win for Punk. Shortly before Over the Limit, Bryan interfered in a match between Punk and Kane to frame Punk attacking Kane with a steel chair, leading to a three-way feud. During this time, a jilted AJ Lee turned her affections to both Punk and Kane. On the June 1 episode of SmackDown, Bryan's interference caused WWE Championship match between Punk and Kane to end in a double disqualification, resulting in a triple threat match being set up on June 17 at No Way Out, where Punk managed to retain the title after AJ distracted Kane. On the June 25 episode of Raw SuperShow, Bryan defeated Punk and Kane in a non-title three-way elimination match to earn another shot at the WWE Championship. At Money in the Bank on July 15, Bryan failed to capture the WWE Championship again from Punk in a no disqualification match with AJ as special guest referee. The following night on Raw SuperShow, AJ accepted Bryan's marriage proposal. On Raw 1000, Bryan's storyline wedding ended in failure when AJ left Bryan at the altar and instead accepted Mr. McMahon's offer of the position of permanent Raw General Manager. Bryan's night turned from bad to worse as he was later attacked by The Rock and insulted by celebrity Charlie Sheen.

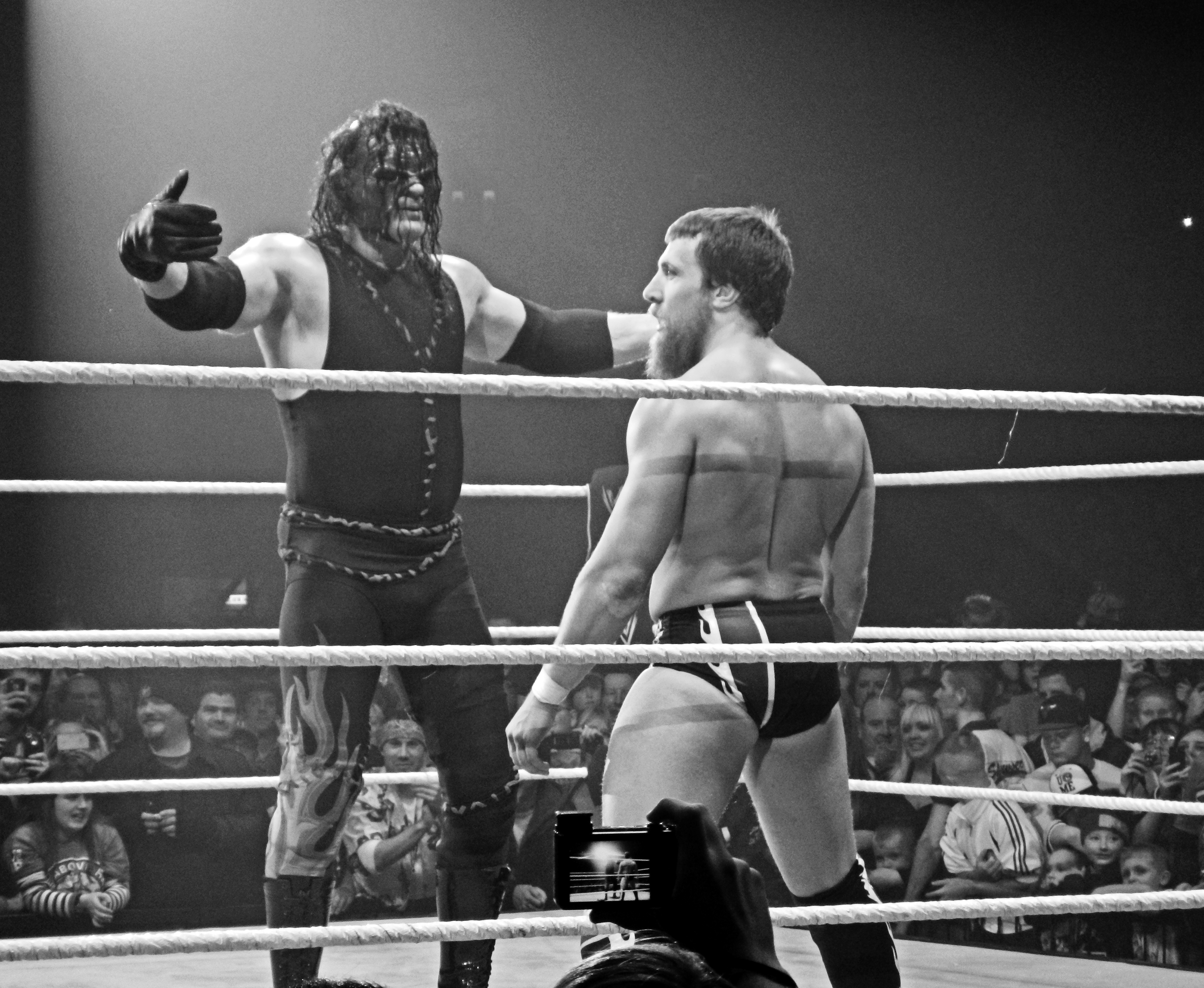
Kane offers to "hug it out" with Bryan.

AJ's rejection of Bryan turned him into an angry and bitter individual and resulted in Bryan lashing out at audiences. AJ continued to exact her revenge on Bryan by denying him a WWE Championship match and instead forcing him to face Kane on August 19 at SummerSlam, where Bryan emerged victorious. As a result of Bryan and Kane's issues, AJ enrolled them in anger management classes hosted by Dr. Shelby and they were later forced to "hug it out". At the arrangement of Dr. Shelby and AJ, Bryan turned face once again when he and Kane formed a team whose constant bickering and infighting even during matches inadvertently resulted in them defeating The Prime Time Players (Titus O'Neil and Darren Young) to become the number one contenders to the WWE Tag Team Championship on the September 10 episode of Raw and then defeating champions Kofi Kingston and R-Truth to win the championship on September 16 at Night of Champions.

The team was named Team Hell No and started a feud with The Shield, leading to a Tables, Ladders and Chairs match on December 16 at TLC: Tables, Ladders & Chairs, where The Shield was victorious after pinning Bryan. On January 27, 2013, at the Royal Rumble, Team Hell No retained the WWE Tag Team Championship against Team Rhodes Scholars. On the February 4 episode of Raw, Bryan was inserted into the World Heavyweight Championship number one contender Elimination Chamber match when he defeated Rey Mysterio, after which the returning Mark Henry attacked both men. On February 17 at Elimination Chamber, Bryan was the first man eliminated from the match, courtesy of Henry. On April 7 at WrestleMania 29, Team Hell No defeated Dolph Ziggler and Big E Langston for another successful title defense.

Team Hell No rekindled their rivalry with The Shield the following night on Raw after saving The Undertaker from an ambush by them. On the April 22 episode of Raw, Team Hell No and The Undertaker were defeated by The Shield in a six-man tag team match. The Shield went on to take out Undertaker and rack up wins over Bryan and Kane in both singles and tag matches that also included WWE Champion John Cena. On May 19 at Extreme Rules, Bryan and Kane lost the WWE Tag Team Championship to Shield members Seth Rollins and Roman Reigns, ending their reign at 245 days.

==== Yes! Movement (2013–2014) ====
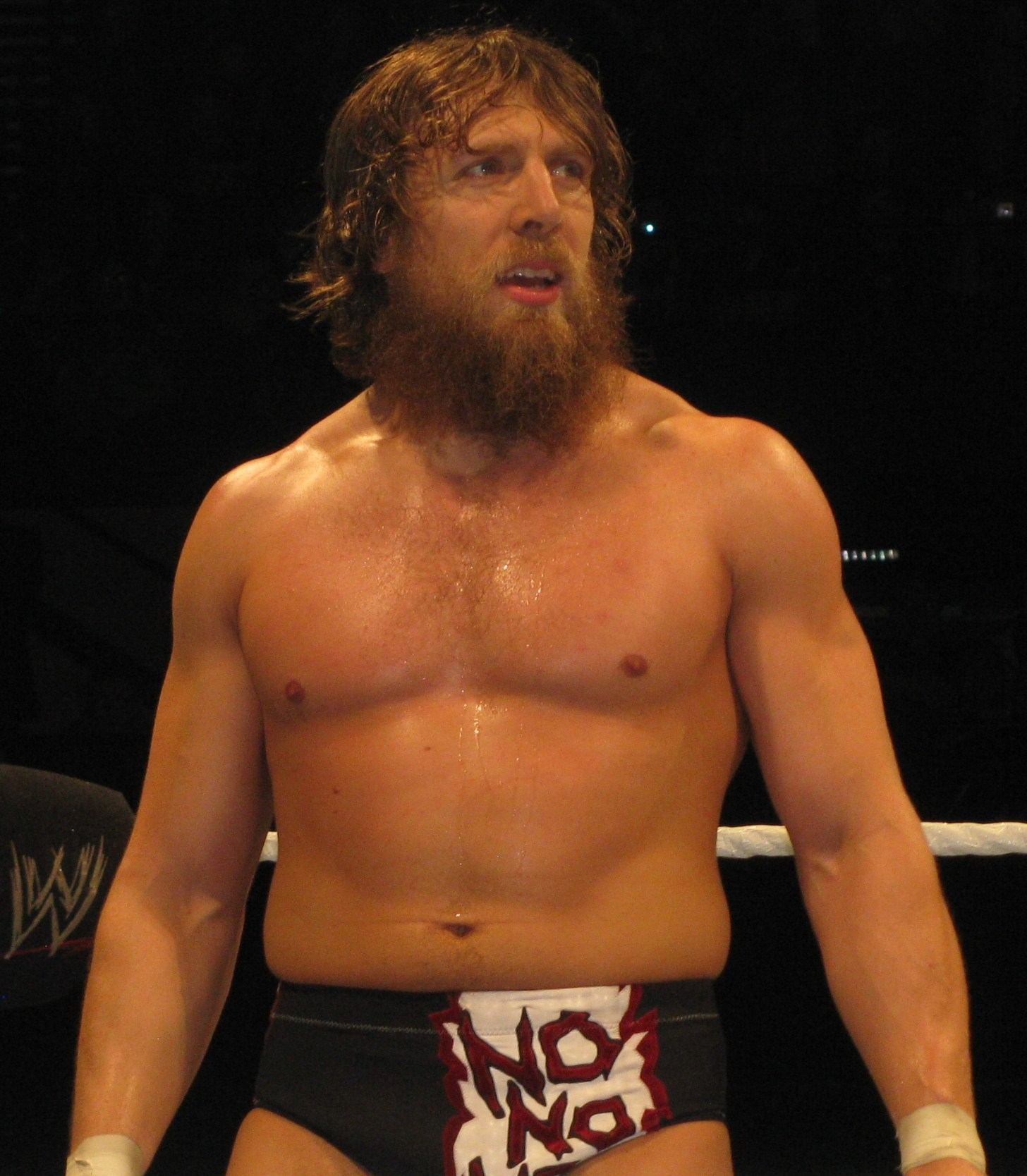
Bryan in July 2013

As Bryan being pinned led to the loss of the WWE Tag Team Championship, he became obsessed about proving that he was not the weak link of Team Hell No and as a result became even more aggressive, but his overzealous behavior led to Team Hell No losing their rematch against Seth Rollins and Roman Reigns on the May 27 episode of Raw. During this storyline, Bryan was praised as the best performer in WWE and having an unmatched connection with crowds by critics, peers and veterans of the professional wrestling industry.

On the June 14 episode of SmackDown, Bryan (with Kane and Randy Orton as his tag team partners) ended The Shield's unpinned and unsubmitted streak in a televised six-man tag match by forcing Rollins to submit. On June 16 at Payback, Bryan and Orton lost against Rollins and Reigns for the WWE Tag Team Championship. The following night on Raw, a match between Bryan and Orton ended via referee stoppage after Bryan suffered a legitimate nerve injury, which was a stinger resulting in Bryan being unable to feel both his arms for the rest of the match.

He's the most technically proficient wrestler the WWE main-event scene has seen possibly since Bret Hart, and he connects with the crowd (the whole crowd — sorry, Mr. Cena) in a near-euphoric way we haven't seen consistently since The Rock in his prime.

— David Shoemaker of Grantland, while declaring Bryan as the MVP for the WWE Midseason Awards in October 2013

Heading to SummerSlam, Bryan started a storyline where WWE chairman Vince McMahon was against Bryan due to Bryan's image not fitting of McMahon's vision of a typical WWE wrestler, while WWE chief operating officer Triple H was in support of Bryan. At SummerSlam, Bryan defeated John Cena to win his first WWE Championship, but after the match special referee Triple H performed his Pedigree finishing move on Bryan, leading to Randy Orton cashing in his Money in the Bank contract to win the title from Bryan.

When [Vince McMahon] had HHH call Bryan a B+ player, that is because Vince saw Bryan that way. Vince was just going to screw Bryan in the storylines and then push him down the card.

— Dave Scherer of PWInsider.com's analysis of Bryan's feud with The Authority

The next night on Raw, Triple H and the McMahons endorsed Orton as "the face of the WWE" while labeling Bryan a "B+ player" and forming The Authority faction. With Triple H threatening to fire anyone who disobeyed him, Bryan was left alone to take on and suffer attacks from Orton and The Shield. Bryan regained the title from Orton at Night of Champions, but was stripped of the title the following night on Raw by Triple H. Bryan wrestled Orton for the vacant titles twice, one at Battleground in a match that ended in a no contest, and the second match was a Hell in a Cell match at Hell in a Cell, where Orton won the title.

I wasn't supposed to be anywhere near the top of the card. I think I was scheduled to wrestle Sheamus, and probably be 5th or 6th match from the top, and maybe get a 10 minute match if we were lucky, but because of fan support, all of the sudden now I'm doing 2 matches and I'm in the main event of WrestleMania.

— Bryan on the original plans for him for WrestleMania XXX

Until January, he was involved in a storyline with The Wyatt Family. Bryan and CM Punk defeated Wyatt Family's Luke Harper and Erick Rowan at Survivor Series, but Harper, Rowan and the leader Bray Wyatt defeated Bryan in a handicap match on December 15 at TLC: Tables, Ladders & Chairs. On the final Raw of 2013, Bryan gave in and joined The Wyatt Family. His ring name was briefly changed to Daniel Wyatt at this time. However, on the January 13, 2014, episode of Raw, after Wyatt and Bryan failed to win the WWE Tag Team Championship against The Usos in a tag team steel cage match, Bryan attacked Wyatt and led the live audience in a "Yes!" chant and gaining more support. At the Royal Rumble on January 26, despite Bryan losing to Wyatt in a singles match and later not participating in the Royal Rumble match, the audience continued to chant for Bryan during the Royal Rumble match and the WWE World Heavyweight Championship match between John Cena and Randy Orton.

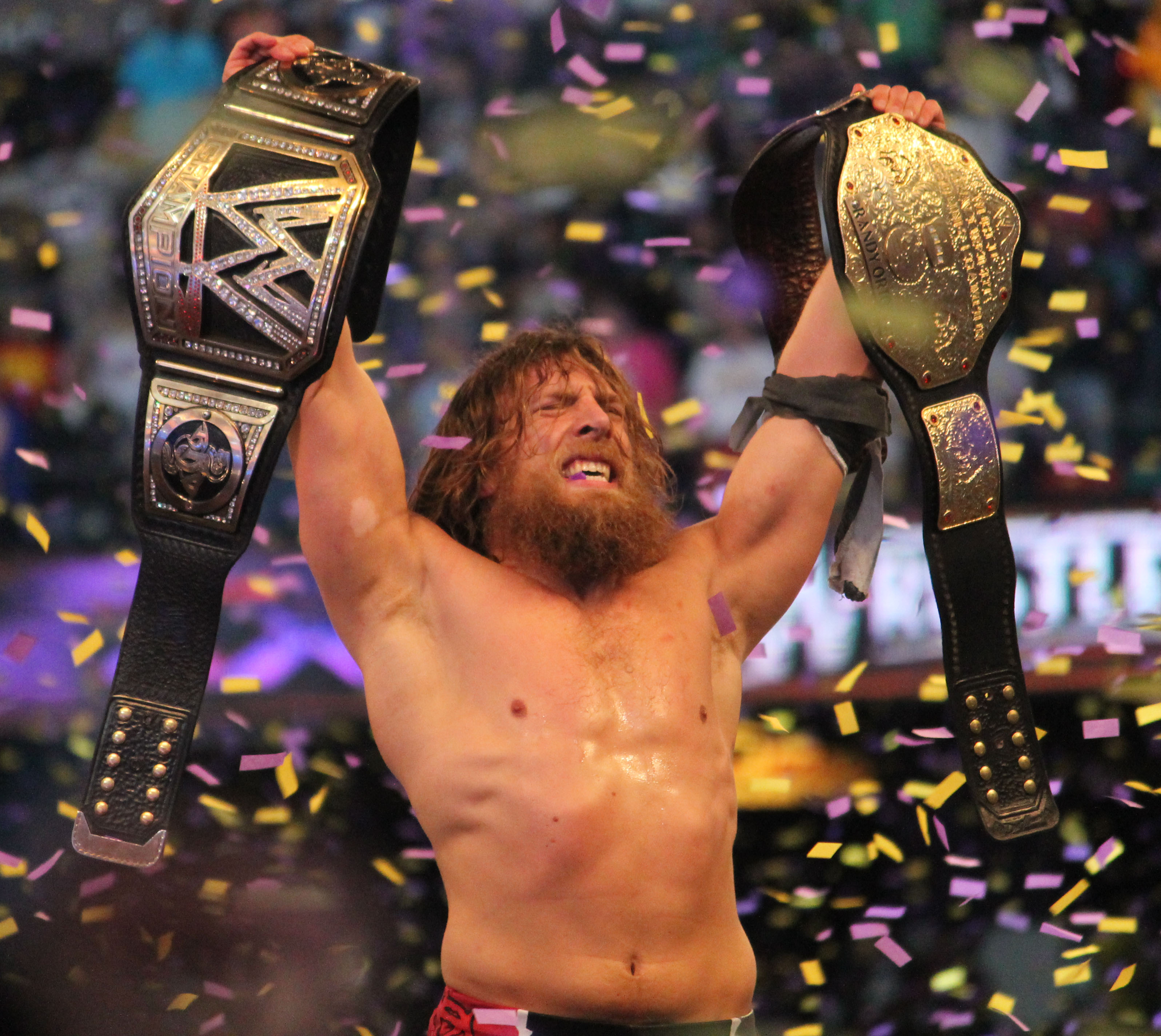
Bryan closed WrestleMania XXX by celebrating his win of the WWE World Heavyweight Championship.

Meanwhile, he also continued his feud with The Authority as Kane attacked him on multiple occasions, attempting to injure Bryan before his Elimination Chamber match on February 23 at Elimination Chamber, in which Bryan survived until he was one of the final two participants, but defending champion Randy Orton retained after Kane interfered in the match by attacking Bryan. On the March 10 episode of Raw, Bryan and multiple fans occupied the ring (while WWE road crew members dressed in Bryan T-shirts posed as fans outside the ring) and refused to leave, resulting in an irate Triple H agreeing to Bryan's demand for a match at WrestleMania XXX, with the stipulation that the winner would be inserted into the WWE World Heavyweight Championship match at WrestleMania. At WrestleMania, Bryan defeated Triple H and, later that night, he won the triple threat match against Batista and champion Randy Orton to win the WWE World Heavyweight Championship. Pro Wrestling Torch editor Wade Keller analyzed (and Danielson later confirmed in his memoir) that Bryan's WrestleMania journey was due to several factors: the fans' rejection of Batista and continual support of Bryan over the previous six months (even when he joined The Wyatt Family) as well as CM Punk legitimately walking out on WWE after the Royal Rumble. Both Bryan and Chris Jericho later said that Bryan's original WrestleMania XXX opponent was supposed to be Sheamus.

I don't know how my life got to be like this... I'm just a normal dude. I was never a special athlete. I wasn't great at any sports or anything like that. And now an arena full of people were chanting, 'You deserve it'. And I don't know what I've done to deserve it.

— Bryan reacts to the events of the Raw after WrestleMania XXX

The Pro Wrestling Torch Newsletter wrote: "Leading into WrestleMania 30, the Daniel Bryan vs. Triple H program was the top draw of Raw each week. Coming out of WM30, Bryan as new WWE World Hvt. champion has been solidified as a ratings draw". This trend continued until at least May 2014, when Bryan had to undergo neck surgery due to his first of the two major injuries that would eventually force him to retire in February 2016.

On the Raw following WrestleMania XXX, Triple H used his authority to grant himself a title match against Bryan, who was then attacked by Orton, Batista and Kane just before the match which ended in a no contest and Bryan's retention when The Shield interfered to chase away Bryan's adversaries. Stephanie McMahon enticed Kane to return to his masked self which Kane complied and was granted a future title match against Bryan and proceeded to carry out a brutal attack against Bryan which led to a scripted injury to give him time off to mourn his recently deceased father. At Extreme Rules on May 4, Bryan defeated Kane in an Extreme Rules match to retain the WWE World Heavyweight Championship.

==== Major injury and Intercontinental Champion (2014–2015) ====
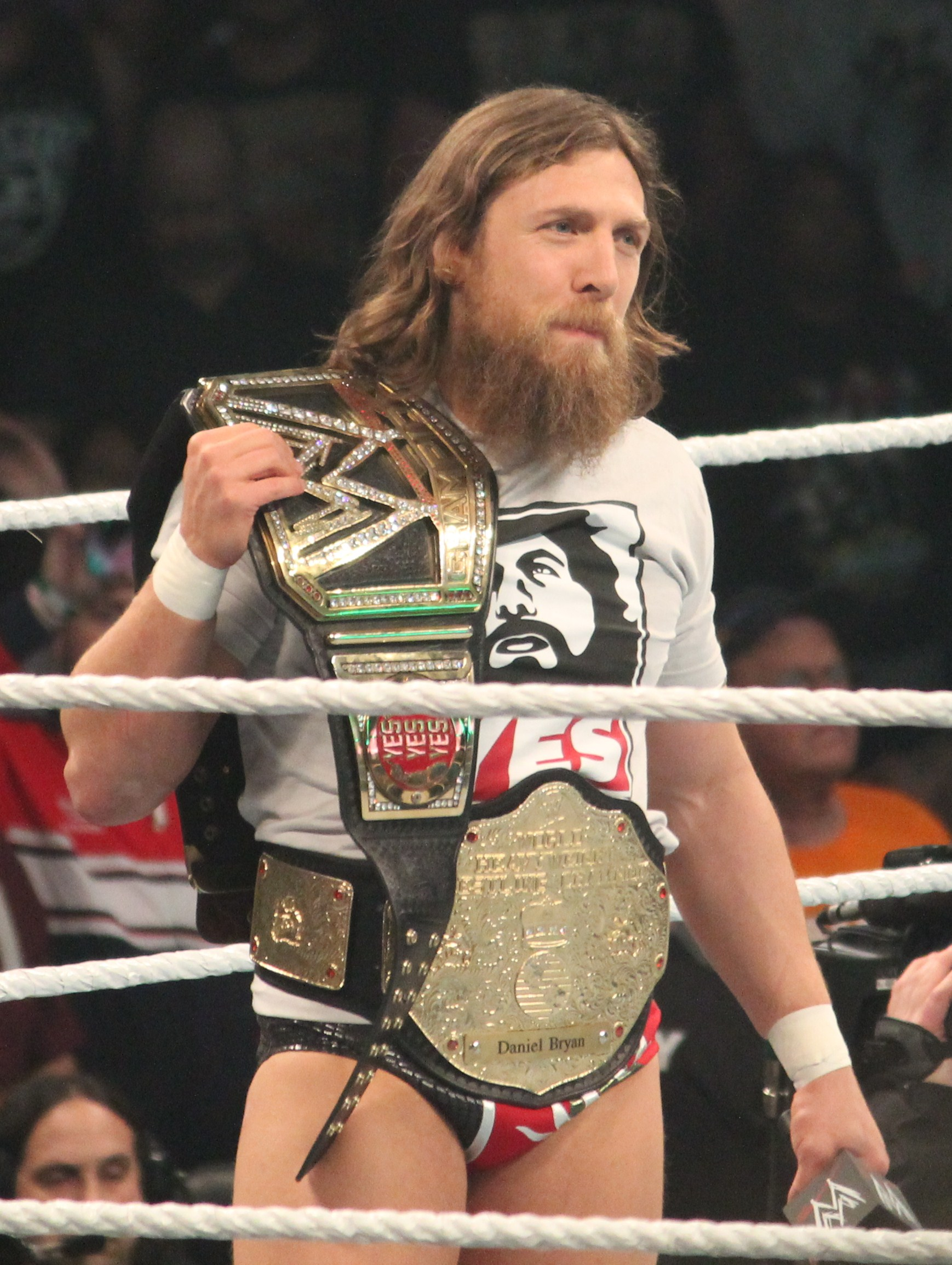
Bryan as WWE World Heavyweight Champion in April 2014

At some point in time, Bryan lost all strength in his right arm and required neck surgery. On the May 12 episode of Raw, he was attacked by Kane and stretchered away that same night to justify his absence. On May 15, Bryan underwent successful neck surgery, with a cervical foraminotomy to decompress the nerve root having been performed, but he was stripped of the WWE World Heavyweight title when it was revealed that Bryan would not be able to compete at Money in the Bank. Due to his injury, Bryan was largely off WWE television during this period. Months after the neck surgery, Bryan's strength still had not returned to his arm. He returned on November to television, returning to the ring on the January 15, 2015, episode of SmackDown.

Bryan entered the 2015 Royal Rumble match at number 10, being eliminated by Bray Wyatt in the first half of the match, causing the Philadelphia crowd to repeatedly chant for him during the second half of the match while booing other wrestlers entering the match, including eventual winner and fellow "good guy" Roman Reigns.

Bryan came in like a homecoming hero and was gone, just a few minutes later, like a freshman nerd. ... Beyond that, the lion's share of the WWE audience wants him to be a top guy – and are willing to pay for that.

— Mike Johnson of PWInsider.com on Bryan's showing in the 2015 Royal Rumble match.

His workrate in the ring and what he gives through the match just means so much more to the wrestling fans than anything else... His run [as champion] was cut short and I think fans wanted to see him get that [WrestleMania] moment that he deserves... WWE put a line through that.

— Bret Hart in March 2015

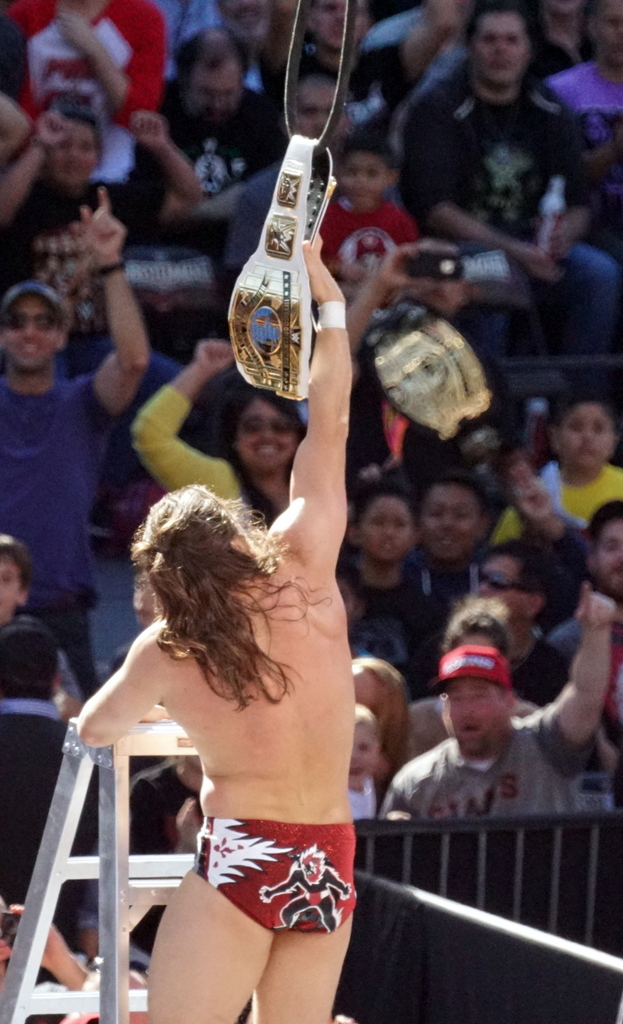
Bryan won the Intercontinental Championship at WrestleMania 31.

After defeating Kane in a casket match on January 29, Bryan won the WWE Intercontinental Championship at WrestleMania 31 in a multi-man ladder match. This made him one of six wrestlers at the time to achieve WWE's new Grand Slam due to winning every male active title in WWE, while also making him WWE's 26th Triple Crown Champion.

WWE's storylines for Bryan since his return were widely criticized. Dave Scherer of Pro Wrestling Insider questioned "bringing Bryan back for the Rumble in the first place" if there was no intention of letting Bryan win. Benjamin Tucker of Pro Wrestling Torch criticized WWE for having "watered down" Bryan's heroic character to a "sneaky, backstabbing, cheap, aggravating jerk" for the feud against Roman Reigns. Mike Tedesco of WrestleView wrote in March that WWE "killed Daniel Bryan and Randy Orton dead in the last two months. It takes a special bunch of nincompoops to pull that off". Jake Barnett of Pro Wrestling Dot Net said that Bryan being labeled a "turd" was "asking fans to disbelieve what they see with their own eyes" and "will do nothing to calm down the conspiracy theorists who insist WWE is intentionally cooling off Bryan to make Reigns look better in comparison". In a piece for the Wrestling Observer, Zach Dominello was "dumbfounded and disheartened" that "after returning from a very serious injury, WWE's bright idea is to put Bryan in one of the most dangerous matches possible at WrestleMania", while having "dragged Bryan down to the levels of R-Truth and Stardust". On the April 16 episode of SmackDown, in his last in-ring match for nearly three years, Bryan teamed up with United States Champion John Cena to defeat WWE Tag Team Champions Cesaro and Tyson Kidd by submission.

==== First retirement (2015–2016) ====
[Professional wrestling] is a far better place because of his involvement. There were things dating back to 2001 that he was involved with that changed the underground foundation of the industry, and over the past few years, significantly changed talent evaluation at the highest level of the industry.

— Dave Meltzer in 2016, reflecting just after Bryan's retirement

Following the April 16 episode of SmackDown, WWE pulled Bryan from wrestling on the remainder of WWE's touring of Europe as a "precautionary measure". Bryan's scheduled title defense at Extreme Rules on April 26 against Bad News Barrett was later canceled as Bryan was "medically unable to compete". Less than a week later, WWE stopped advertising Bryan from all future live events or television tapings. After about a month off television, Bryan returned on the May 11 episode of Raw to explain that after having undergone an MRI he would be out for an unknown period of time and could possibly have to retire (though the nature of his injuries were not revealed), therefore he relinquished the Intercontinental Championship. On the Elimination Chamber pre-show on May 31, Bryan stated that he would eventually wrestle again.

In July 2015, Bryan revealed that his injury was concussion-related and claimed that he had been cleared to return to the ring by external medical professionals and was waiting for WWE to clear him. During his time away, he trimmed his signature beard and cut his hair short, donating his hair to Wigs 4 Kids, a charity similar to Locks of Love. On February 8, 2016, Bryan retired for medical reasons. Later on that day's episode of Raw, broadcast from Bryan's home state of Washington, Bryan gave a retirement speech expressing his gratefulness for the happiness wrestling had brought him. The following day on ESPN, Bryan revealed that he suffered ten documented concussions while wrestling, but more might have been undocumented or misdiagnosed. He said a recent EEG reflex test revealed slowing and a small subacute or chronic lesion in his brain's temporoparietal region, which explained Bryan's post-concussion seizures and led to his retirement decision.

Bryan had been cleared by a doctor for the Arizona Cardinals and passed a concussion test at UCLA with "flying colors", but WWE's head of medical Joseph Maroon refused to clear him. Journalist Dave Meltzer suggested that this may have been because of Maroon having been portrayed in a negative light in the film Concussion. Initially, Bryan requested his release from WWE and was looking to return to NJPW and ROH as well as work in Mexico for Consejo Mundial de Lucha Libre (CMLL), but the request was turned down by Vince McMahon. Bryan underwent a new test, where the lesion in his brain was discovered, after which he himself made the decision to retire. On Thank You Daniel, a WWE Network tribute to Bryan, he confirmed that he had been asked about working for WWE in a different capacity while comparing this to "a partner breaking up with you, getting married to someone else and then asking you to be best friends", expanding to say that he needed time to heal emotionally before he could agree to such an offer. During this period, WWE confirmed that Bryan would continue to appear for the company in a non in-ring role alongside his wife Brie Bella, who served as a WWE Ambassador following her retirement from in-ring competition on April 3 at WrestleMania 32. Recognized as a WWE Legend, Bryan co-hosted the WWE Network tournament Cruiserweight Classic alongside SmackDown commentator Mauro Ranallo in mid-2016.

==== SmackDown General Manager (2016–2018) ====
With the inception of WWE's second brand split, Bryan was appointed as SmackDown General Manager on the July 18 episode of Raw. After SummerSlam on August 21, Bryan unveiled two new championships exclusive to the SmackDown brand: the SmackDown Women's Championship and the SmackDown Tag Team Championship. He also co-hosted Talking Smack with Renee Young, a post-show interview segment on the WWE Network. The segment frequently became the site for heated altercations between Bryan and The Miz; Bryan openly expressed his disdain while The Miz complained about being mistreated. The two continued to feud for the rest of the year, with The Miz often running away from Bryan when a physical altercation was teased.

On the April 10 and 11, 2017 episodes of Raw and SmackDown Live, Bryan was involved in the 2017 Superstar Shake-up in which brand's former champions Alexa Bliss, Bray Wyatt, Dean Ambrose, The Miz, Heath Slater and Rhyno were traded to Raw. Bryan later took time off from WWE television for paternity leave and returned on the June 20 episode of SmackDown Live, during which he stripped Carmella of her Money In The Bank briefcase and suspended James Ellsworth due to his interference in the match. On the August 1 episode of SmackDown Live, Bryan appointed Shane McMahon as a guest referee for United States Champion AJ Styles's title defense against Kevin Owens at SummerSlam on August 20, thereby triggering a long-term feud between Owens and Shane that would ultimately also involve Bryan himself. Bryan was again absent from television after being attacked by Kane on the October 30 episode of Raw. He returned on the November 14 episode of SmackDown Live.

After Survivor Series on November 19, Bryan became deeply involved in Shane McMahon's feud against Kevin Owens and Sami Zayn, favoring the latter two. On the November 21 episode of SmackDown Live Shane was about to fire the two for attacking him during their Survivor Series interbrand elimination match against Team Raw, which SmackDown ultimately lost. To settle the dispute whether Owens and Zayn should be fired, the two were scheduled to wrestle Randy Orton and Shinsuke Nakamura at Clash of Champions on December 17 with Owens's and Zayn's jobs on the line. During the match Shane and Bryan acted as guest referees and come to blows: after Shane intentionally stopped a count at two during a pinfall attempt by Zayn, while Bryan made a fast count to give Owens and Zayn the win. Over the following weeks, Bryan kept on favoring Owens and Zayn by giving them multiple opportunities at AJ Styles's WWE Championship, first in a handicap title match at the Royal Rumble on January 28, 2018, and then by including Owens and Zayn among the five challengers on March 11 at Fastlane. During the match at Fastlane, Shane broke up pinfall attempts by Owens and Zayn, resulting in a brutal attack by Owens and Zayn on the following episode of SmackDown Live.

==== In-ring return and "The New" Daniel Bryan (2018–2019) ====
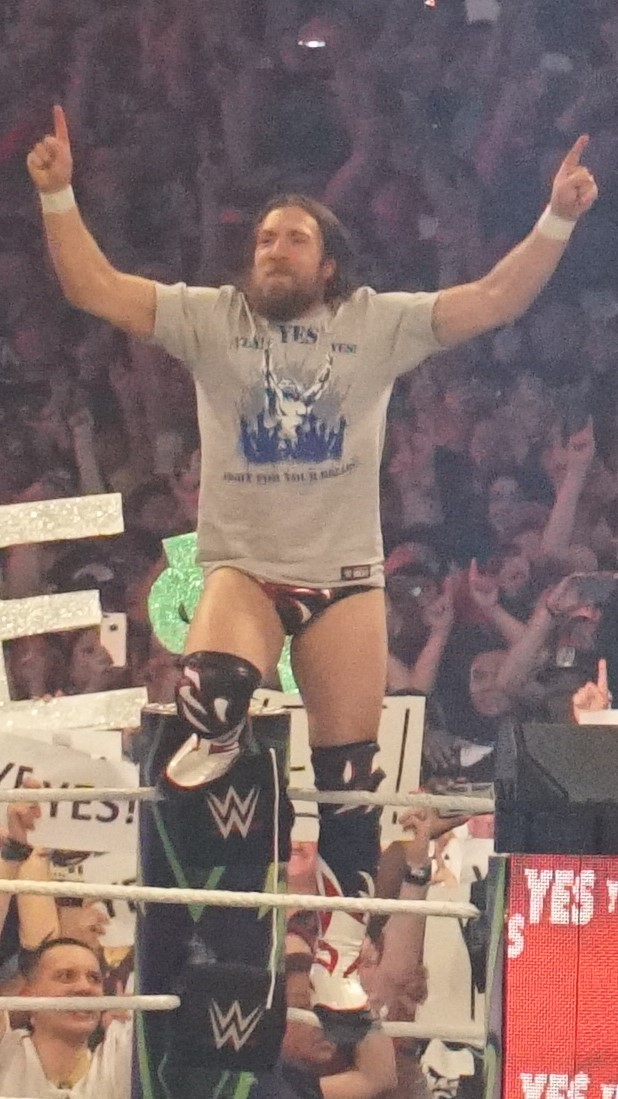
Bryan returned to in-ring competition at WrestleMania 34.

At that time, after more than two years of evaluations, reviews of his medical history and neurological and physical evaluations, Bryan was cleared by three external independent neurosurgeons, neurologists, and concussion experts (in addition to Joseph Maroon) to return to WWE in-ring competition on March 20. He feuded against Kevin Owens and Sami Zayn, wrestling his first match in years at WrestleMania 34, where he and Shane McMahon defeated them. As a result of being medically cleared, Bryan resigned as general manager.

Bryan participated in the 50-man Royal Rumble match at Greatest Royal Rumble on April 27 as the first entrant, lasting for 76 minutes before being eliminated by Big Cass in the final three. He broke the record for longest time spent in a single Royal Rumble match, previously held by Rey Mysterio in 2006. Bryan defeated Cass at Backlash on May 6 and Money in the Bank on June 17. On the June 26 episode of SmackDown Live, Bryan was aided by Kane in a post-match attack from The Bludgeon Brothers, reuniting Team Hell No. At Extreme Rules on July 15, Team Hell No lost to The Bludgeon Brothers after Kane was attacked pre-match with Bryan having to compete in a handicap match.

After months of goading and later avoiding Bryan—as well as getting involved in Team Hell No's feud with The Bludgeon Brothers—Bryan competed against long-time rival The Miz at SummerSlam on August 19, but lost due to an undetected use of brass knuckles. Following SummerSlam, at Hell in a Cell Bryan and his wife Brie Bella lost to The Miz and Maryse. At Super Show-Down on October 6, Bryan defeated The Miz to earn a WWE Championship opportunity against AJ Styles at Crown Jewel on November 2. However, in wake of the Khashoggi death incident he refused to work the Crown Jewel event in Saudi Arabia and the storyline was altered so that their match took place on the October 30 episode of SmackDown Live, which Bryan lost.

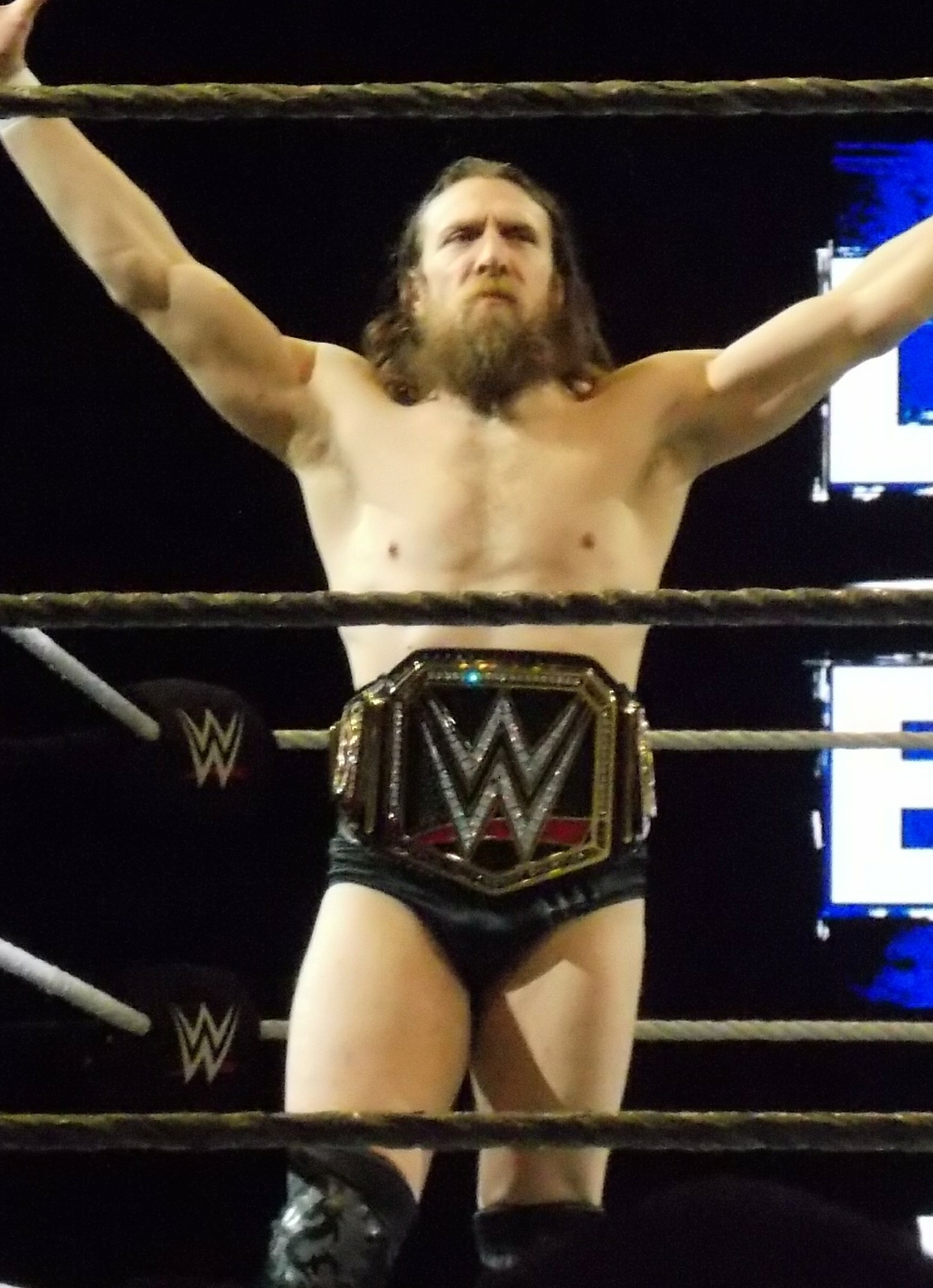
Bryan as WWE Champion in January 2019

On the November 13 episode of SmackDown Live, Bryan defeated AJ Styles to win the WWE Championship for the fourth time following a low blow. After the match, he attacked Styles, turning heel for the first time since 2012. At Survivor Series, he faced WWE Universal Champion Brock Lesnar in an interbrand champion vs. champion match, which he lost. As part of his heel turn, Bryan christened himself as "The New" Daniel Bryan, retaining the title against Styles at TLC: Tables, Ladders & Chairs and Royal Rumble. On the January 29 episode of SmackDown Live, Bryan threw the standard title belt in a garbage can (bemoaning the fact it was made from leather) and introduced a new belt, made from "entirely sustainable materials" and started calling himself "The Planet's Champion". Bryan defended the title in an Elimination Chamber at the Elimination Chamber event, by last eliminating Kofi Kingston. At Fastlane on March 10, Bryan was originally scheduled to defend his championship against Kingston, but after Mr. McMahon replaced Kingston, Bryan successfully retained the title in a triple-threat match against Kevin Owens and Mustafa Ali. Bryan eventually defended the championship against Kingston at WrestleMania 35 on April 7, where Bryan lost, ending his reign at 145 days. On May 6, Bryan competed on his first match on Raw since March 2015, where he lost to Kingston in a WrestleMania rematch, ending their feud.

On the May 7 episode of SmackDown Live, Bryan and Rowan defeated The Usos for the vacant WWE SmackDown Tag Team Championship, marking their first reign as a team. At Money in the Bank on May 19, Bryan and Rowan faced off against The Usos in a non title match in a losing effort. At Stomping Grounds on June 23, Bryan and Rowan defeated Heavy Machinery (Otis and Tucker) to retain the titles. On July 14 at Extreme Rules, Bryan and Rowan lost the titles to The New Day (Big E and Xavier Woods) in a triple threat tag-team match, which also involved Heavy Machinery.

In August 2019, Bryan and Rowan became involved in a storyline with Roman Reigns, as Reigns was being targeted for attacks by a mystery conspirator. Reigns suspected Rowan as his attacker due to seemingly incriminating video footage, but Bryan instead revealed that the attacker was merely a man who resembled Rowan. However, Rowan later turned on Bryan and revealed that he was the attacker the entire time, ending the alliance between the two. On the September 24 episode of SmackDown Live, Bryan was saved by Reigns from an assault from Rowan and Luke Harper. Bryan then joined with Reigns to take down Rowan and Harper, thus turning face once again in the process. At Hell in a Cell on October 6, Bryan and Reigns defeated Rowan and Harper.

==== Universal Championship pursuits and departure (2019–2021) ====
On the November 8 episode of SmackDown, Bryan was attacked by Universal Champion "The Fiend" Bray Wyatt. In response, Bryan challenged Wyatt for the Universal Championship at Survivor Series on November 24, which Bryan lost. On the following SmackDown, after Wyatt challenged Bryan to another match, Bryan accepted the challenge and said that the Yes Movement was back. During the Yes chants, Wyatt appeared as The Fiend and attacked Bryan, ripping out his hair and beard. Bryan, sporting a clean shave and hair cut short, returned at TLC: Tables, Ladders & Chairs on December 15 to attack Wyatt. On the December 20 episode of SmackDown, Bryan defeated The Miz and King Corbin in a triple threat match to earn another Universal Championship match at the Royal Rumble on January 26, 2020, but Bryan was again unsuccessful at the event.

Bryan then began a rivalry with Drew Gulak, who claimed to have "found holes in Bryan's game". This led to a match being made for Elimination Chamber on March 8, which Bryan won. On the March 13 episode of SmackDown, Bryan formed an alliance with Gulak, as Gulak managed Bryan during his match against Cesaro, where both were subsequently attacked by Cesaro, Shinsuke Nakamura, and Intercontinental Champion Sami Zayn. On the March 27 episode of SmackDown, after Gulak defeated Nakamura, Bryan earned an Intercontinental Championship match against Zayn at the first night of WrestleMania 36 on April 4, which he lost. At Money in the Bank on May 10, Bryan competed in the Money in the Bank ladder match, but was unsuccessful as the match was won by Otis. On the May 15 episode of SmackDown, Bryan defeated Gulak in the quarter-finals of a tournament for the vacant Intercontinental Championship. On the May 29 episode of SmackDown, Bryan then defeated Sheamus in the semi-finals who replaced Bryan's scheduled opponent Jeff Hardy, who was arrested for crashing his car into Elias and who had won a battle royal to face Bryan. Bryan ultimately lost to AJ Styles in the finals on the June 12 episode of SmackDown.

After taking a hiatus, Bryan returned on the October 16 episode of SmackDown. On the TLC: Tables, Ladders & Chairs pre-show on December 20, Bryan, Big E, Chad Gable and Otis defeated Sami Zayn, King Corbin, Shinsuke Nakamura and Cesaro. Following this, Bryan participated in the Royal Rumble on January 31, 2021, but was eliminated by Seth Rollins. Bryan competed in an Elimination Chamber match at Elimination Chamber on February 21, where the winner would receive a match for the Universal Championship immediately. Bryan won the match, but was quickly defeated by Universal Champion Roman Reigns. Bryan would subsequently request a rematch from Reigns, which he would receive at Fastlane on March 21, in a match where Edge was the special guest enforcer. In the main event of Fastlane, Bryan was defeated by Reigns after Edge had attacked both men with a steel chair. Afterwards, it was announced that Bryan would again challenge Reigns for the Universal Championship at the main event of night 2 of WrestleMania 37, in a triple threat match also including Edge. On the second night of WrestleMania 37 on April 11, Bryan failed to win the title after Reigns pinned both him and Edge. On April 30, he lost to Reigns in a championship vs. career match, meaning that he became banished from SmackDown. This was Bryan's final match in WWE; on May 4, it was reported that his contract with WWE had expired later that week, and that the company was "pushing hard" for him to sign a new one. On the June 27, 2022, episode of Raw, Bryan made an appearance via a video to congratulate John Cena on his career.

=== All Elite Wrestling / Ring of Honor (2021–present) ===
==== Championship pursuits (2021–2022) ====
On September 5, 2021, Danielson made his surprise debut for All Elite Wrestling (AEW) at the All Out pay-per-view, confronting The Elite; the team had been joined by Adam Cole, who had made his debut just moments earlier. Danielson came to the aid of Christian Cage and Jurassic Express following a brawl between the two teams after Kenny Omega had retained the AEW World Championship against Cage. At Dynamite: Grand Slam on September 22, Omega and Danielson fought to a 30-minute time limit draw in a non-title match. Danielson won the AEW World Championship Eliminator Tournament (an eight-man single-elimination tournament) and received a future AEW World Championship match after defeating Dustin Rhodes, Eddie Kingston, and Miro in the finals on November 13 at Full Gear. He would then feud with the recently crowned AEW World Champion "Hangman" Adam Page, who he faced on December 15 at Winter is Coming. The match ended in another 60 minute time-limit draw, giving Danielson his second 5-star match from Meltzer. On the January 5, 2022, episode of Dynamite, Danielson once again faced Page for the World Championship, but was defeated, marking his first loss in AEW.

==== Blackpool Combat Club (2022–2024) ====
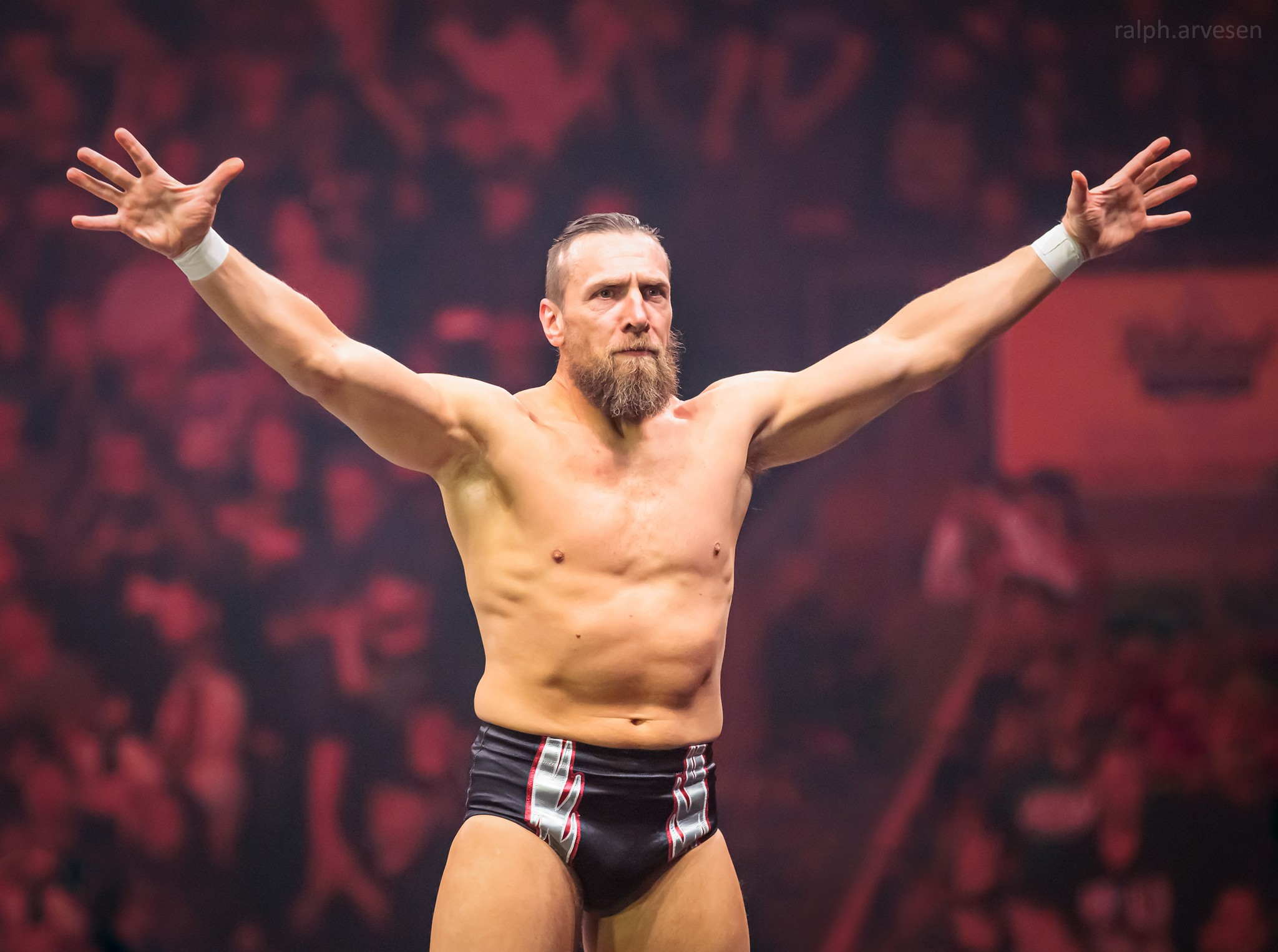
Danielson in 2022

Shortly thereafter, he began a storyline with the recently returning Jon Moxley, offering to team up with him. However, Moxley stated that he would only team with Danielson if they wrestled each other first. At Revolution on March 6, Danielson lost to Moxley, after which the two began brawling; William Regal, once a mentor to both men, then made his surprise debut to break up the fight and force them to shake hands. The two formed a team with Regal acting as their manager, later being named the Blackpool Combat Club.

Following this, Wheeler Yuta was recruited into the group. They soon began a feud with the Jericho Appreciation Society, whom they lost to at Double or Nothing on May 29 in an Anarchy in the Arena match. On the June 22 episode of Dynamite, Danielson revealed that he was not medically cleared to compete against Zack Sabre Jr. at Forbidden Door on June 26, instead organizing a replacement as "the one person" he trusted to take his place at the event and the subsequent Blood and Guts special episode of Dynamite. At Forbidden Door, the debuting Claudio Castagnoli took Danielson's place, defeating Sabre Jr. and joining the Blackpool Combat Club. On the August 24 episode of Dynamite, Danielson challenged Chris Jericho to a match at All Out on September 4, which he accepted. At All Out, Danielson lost to Jericho.

Afterwards, he competed in a tournament for the AEW World Championship, defeating Adam Page and Jericho before losing in the finals to Moxley at Grand Slam on September 21. The following week, Jericho gave Daniel Garcia an ultimatum about his loyalties, who told Jericho he did not take orders from him. Danielson came down and told Garcia to make his own decision, and offered him a spot in the Blackpool Combat Club. On the October 12 episode of Dynamite, Danielson lost to Jericho in a ROH World Championship match after Garcia hit Danielson with his ROH Pure Championship. At the Full Gear event on November 19, Danielson challenged for the ROH World Championship in a four-way match involving Jericho, Castagnoli and Sammy Guevara, but lost.

After this, Danielson began a rivalry with AEW World Champion MJF. The two faced in a 60-minute Iron Man match at the Revolution event on March 5, 2023, which Danielson lost after the match went to sudden death overtime. The match was met with critical acclaim, and received a 5 3/4 star rating from Dave Meltzer. On the following episode of Dynamite, Danielson declared that it was time for him "to go home". Danielson returned on the March 29 episode of Dynamite where he seemingly came out to help Kenny Omega from an attack by Moxley, Castagnoli, and Yuta but joined the group in attacking Omega, turning heel in the process. At Double or Nothing on May 28, the Blackpool Combat Club defeated The Elite (Omega, Adam Page, and The Young Bucks) in an Anarchy in the Arena match.

At All Out on September 3, Danielson made his return from injury as a face and defeated Ricky Starks in a No Disqualification Strap match. On October 1 at WrestleDream, Danielson defeated Zack Sabre Jr. On November 11, Danielson and AEW president Tony Khan announced a tournament called the Continental Classic, which Danielson also announced he will be one of 12 competitors where he would compete in the Blue League. Danielson finished top of his block with 10 points, allowing him to advance to the semi-final round. In the semi-final round, Danielson was defeated by Eddie Kingston, eliminating him from the tournament.

On the December 15 episode of Ring of Honor Wrestling, Danielson would make his return to Ring of Honor, now the sister promotion of All Elite Wrestling, for the first time since 2009, by challenging FTR (Dax Harwood and Cash Wheeler) and Mark Briscoe to a match at Final Battle against the Blackpool Combat Club in honor of Briscoe's later brother Jay. At the event, held later that month, the Blackpool Combat Club were defeated. On March 3, 2024, at Revolution, Danielson unsuccessfully challenged Eddie Kingston for the Continental Crown Championship. On April 21 at Dynasty, Danielson was defeated by Will Ospreay. Danielson returned on the May 8 episode of Dynamite, becoming the final member of Team AEW with Eddie Kingston (later replaced by Darby Allin) and FTR (Cash Wheeler and Dax Harwood) to take on The Elite in an Anarchy in the Arena match at Double or Nothing on May 26. At Double or Nothing, Team AEW was defeated by The Elite.

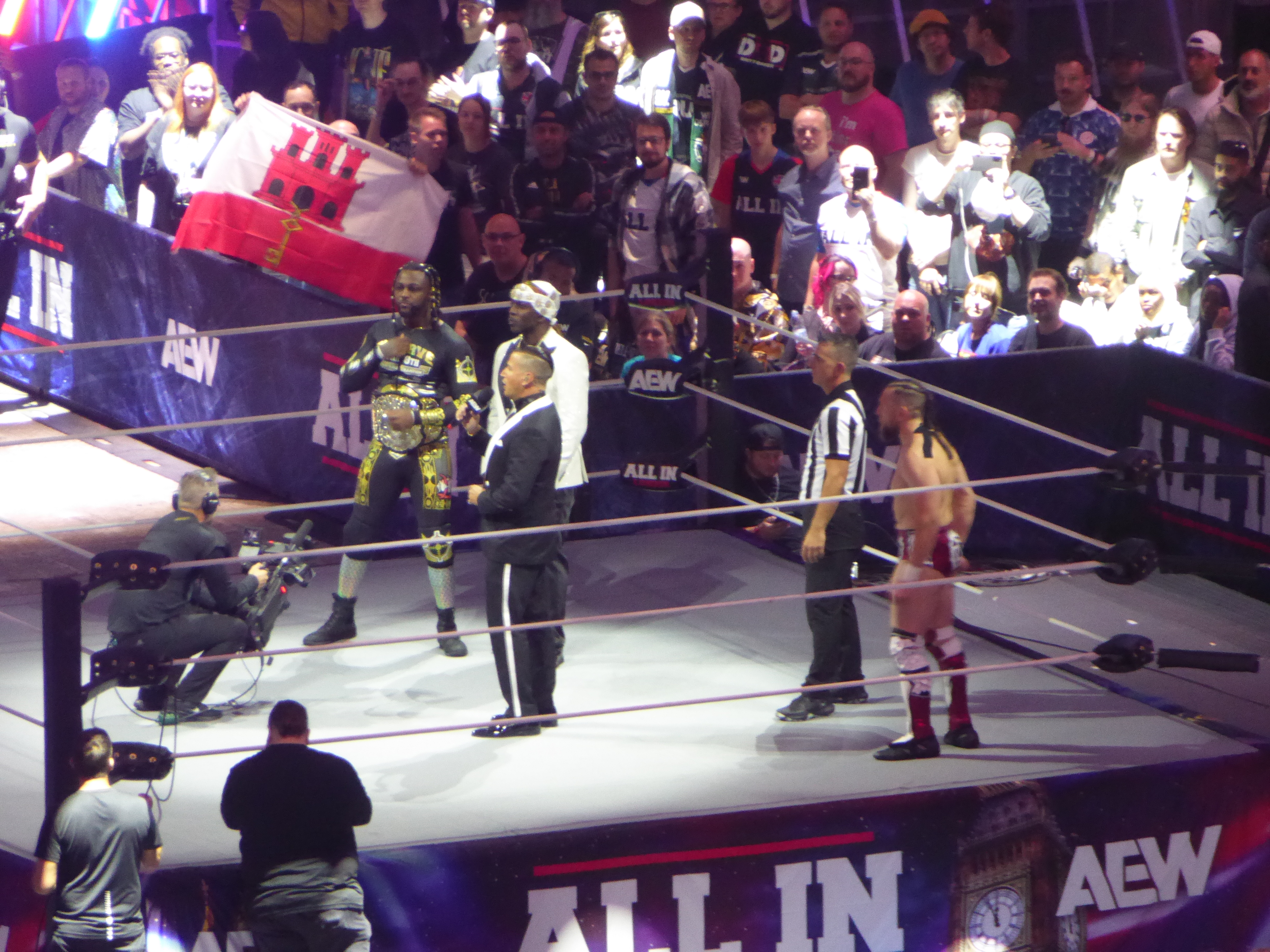
Danielson in the ring with Swerve Strickland at All In in August 2024

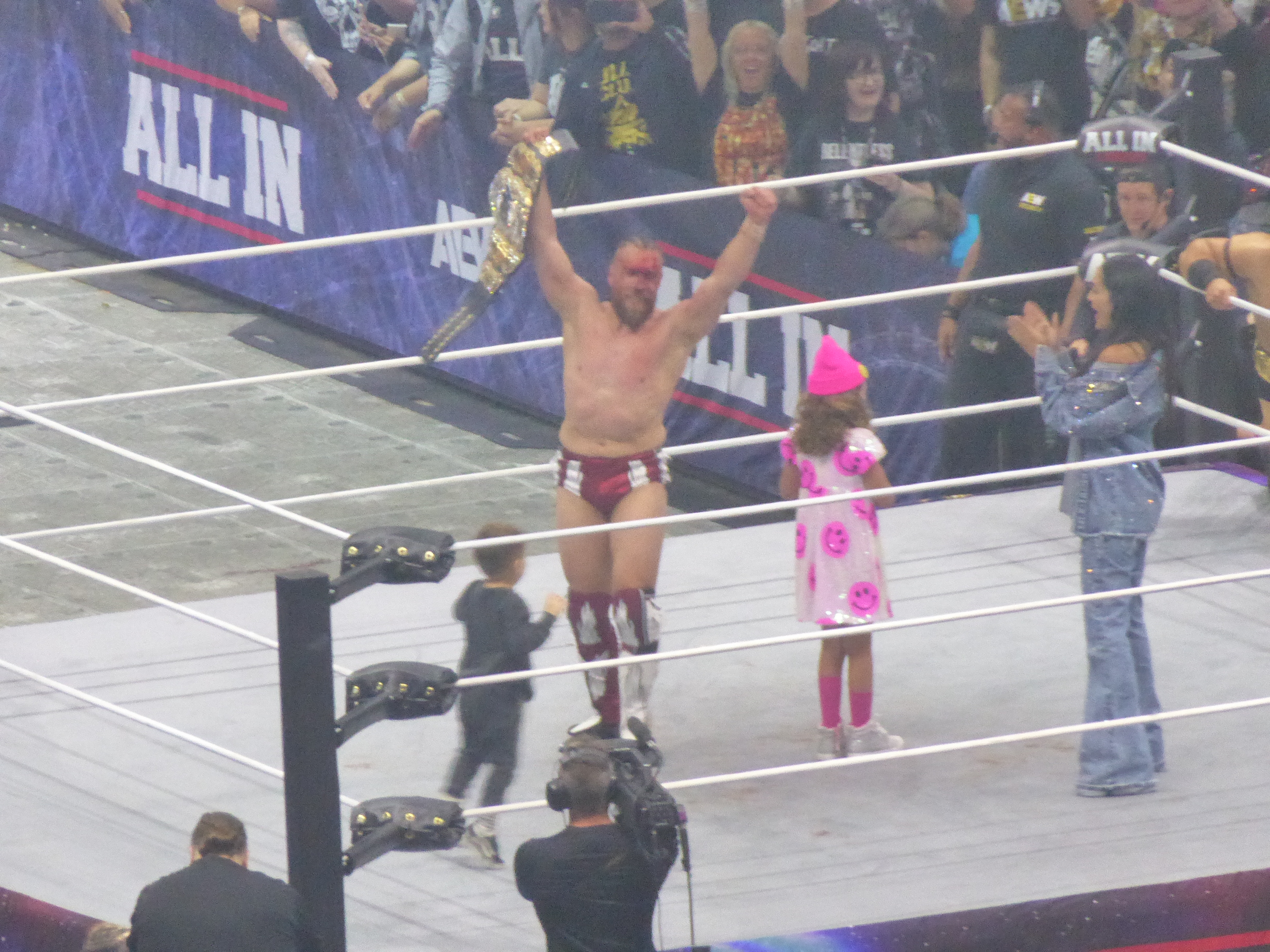
Danielson celebrating with his family after winning the AEW World Championship at All In in August 2024

In June, Danielson participated in the Owen Hart Foundation Tournament, defeating Shingo Takagi in the first round at Forbidden Door, Pac in the semi-final at Dynamite: Beach Break on July 3 and "Hangman" Adam Page to win the tournament on the July 10 episode of Dynamite. In doing so, he also earned a match against Swerve Strickland for the AEW World Championship at All In on August 25. On the July 31 episode of Dynamite, Danielson declared that if he failed to win the AEW World Championship at All In, he would never wrestle again. At All In, he defeated Strickland to win the AEW World Championship.

On the following episode of Dynamite on August 28, Danielson announced that as long as he is AEW World Champion, he would remain a full-time AEW wrestler and that his full-time career would end as soon as he lost the championship. During his reign, he retained against Jack Perry at All Out on September 7. After the match, he was attacked by Castagnoli and Moxley, leading to Danielson's expulsion from the Blackpool Combat Club. He lost the title against Moxley at WrestleDream on October 12, thus ending his reign at 48 days and full-time wrestling career. After the match, the Blackpool Combat Club would once again attack Danielson, writing him off television indefinitely.

==== Sporadic appearances and commentator (2024–present) ====
On December 9, Danielson made his first appearance since WrestleDream at the All In tickets on-sale rally. In an April 2025 interview, AEW president Tony Khan confirmed that Danielson remained working with AEW behind the scenes, maintaining a role on the company's creative team. On June 25, 2025, after a Collision taping, Danielson competed in his first match since his WrestleDream defeat in a dark match against Max Caster that lasted eight seconds. He also appeared on television at Global Wars Mexico, and All In, the latter of where he aided "Hangman" Adam Page in winning the AEW World Championship from Moxley. After working as the color commentator on the August 20, 2025, episode of Dynamite, and Forbidden Door, he became a full-time color commentator for Dynamite.

On September 30, 2026, at AEW's Tribute to Pac event, Danielson came out of retirement for one night only and wrestled his first televised match since 2024, teaming with the Death Riders (Claudio Castagnoli, Wheeler Yuta, Daniel Garcia, and Gabe Kidd) to defeat The Don Callis Family's Wardlow, Lance Archer, Jake Doyle, Mark Davis, and Josh Alexander.

=== Return to NJPW (2023–2024) ===
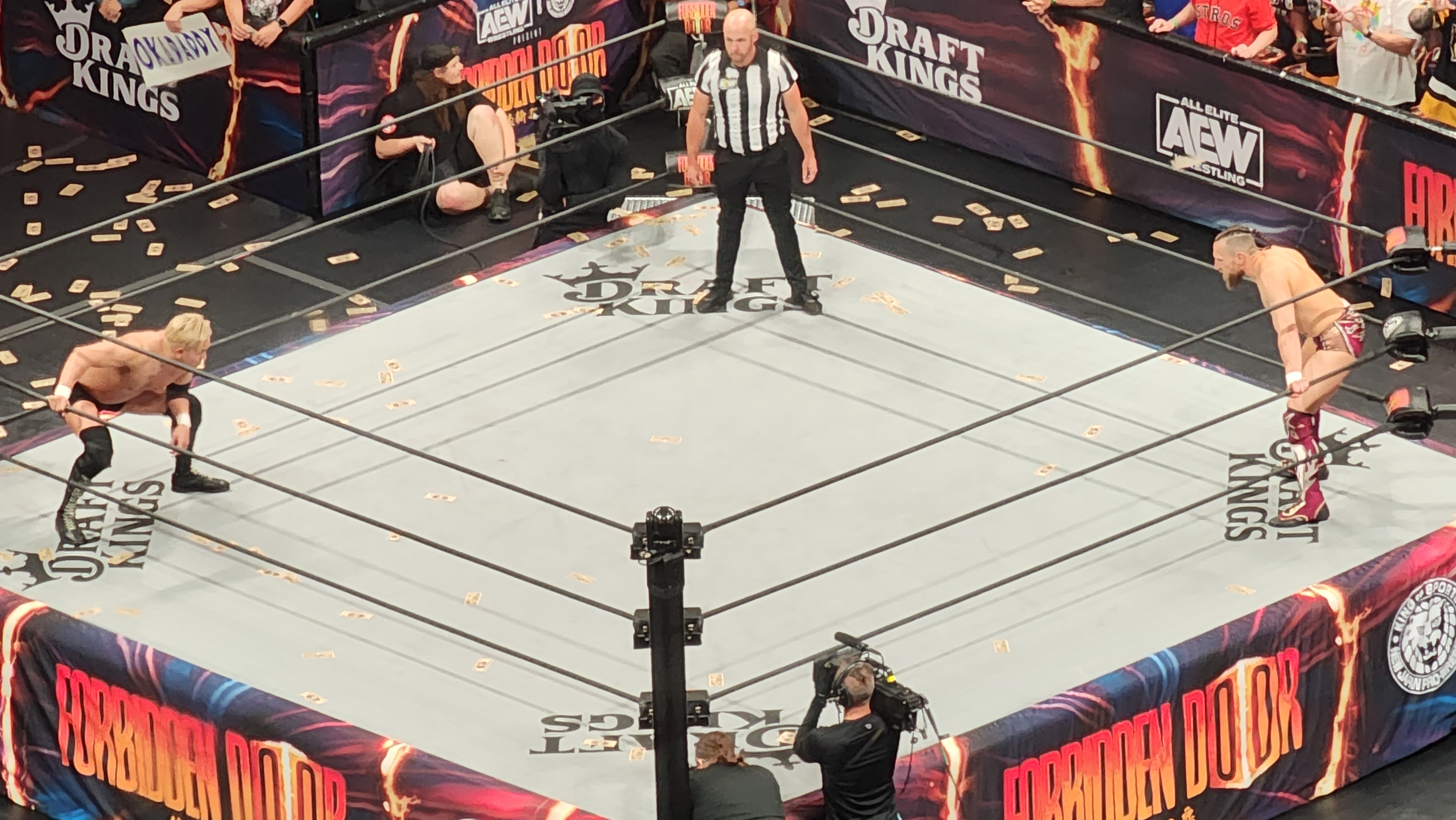
Danielson defeated Kazuchika Okada (left) at Forbidden Door in June 2023.

On June 6, 2023, at Dominion 6.4 in Osaka-jo Hall, Danielson made his return to NJPW for the first time since 2004 in a pre-taped vignette, challenging Kazuchika Okada to a match at Forbidden Door which Okada later accepted at a press conference. At Forbidden Door on June 25, Danielson would defeat Okada via submission, despite suffering a legitimate broken arm following a flying elbow from Okada. On November 4, at Power Struggle, Danielson made another appearance in a pre-taped vignette and challenged Okada to a rematch at Wrestle Kingdom 18 which Okada accepted. On January 4, 2024, at Wrestle Kingdom 18, Danielson was defeated by Okada. After the match both men bowed to one another, showing their mutual respect. At The New Beginning in Osaka, Danielson was defeated by Zack Sabre Jr., in a rematch from AEW WrestleDream.

=== Consejo Mundial de Lucha Libre (2024–2025) ===
On March 29, 2024, at Homenaje a Dos Leyendas, Danielson made his Consejo Mundial de Lucha Libre (CMLL) debut, teaming with Claudio Castagnoli, Jon Moxley, and Matt Sydal in a losing effort against Volador Jr., Blue Panther, Místico, and Último Guerrero. After the match, Danielson was challenged to a singles match by Blue Panther. The two would wrestle in a submission match on the April 5 edition of CMLL Super Viernes, where Danielson defeated Panther. On June 26, 2025, taped on June 18 at the co-promoted show Global Wars Mexico, Danielson, Atlantis, Hologram, and Máscara Dorada came to the aid of Blue Panther from an attack by Shane Taylor Promotions (Shane Taylor, Carlie Bravo, and Shawn Dean).

== Professional wrestling style and persona ==
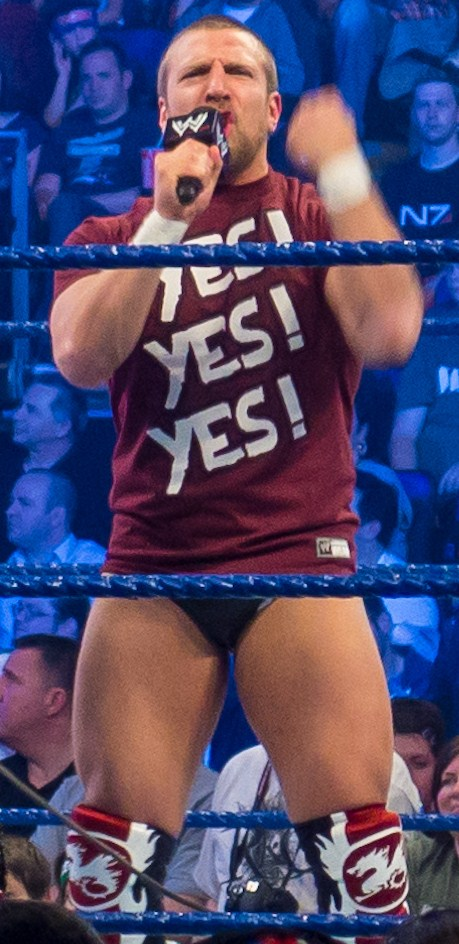
Bryan in his signature "Yes!" T-shirt in 2012

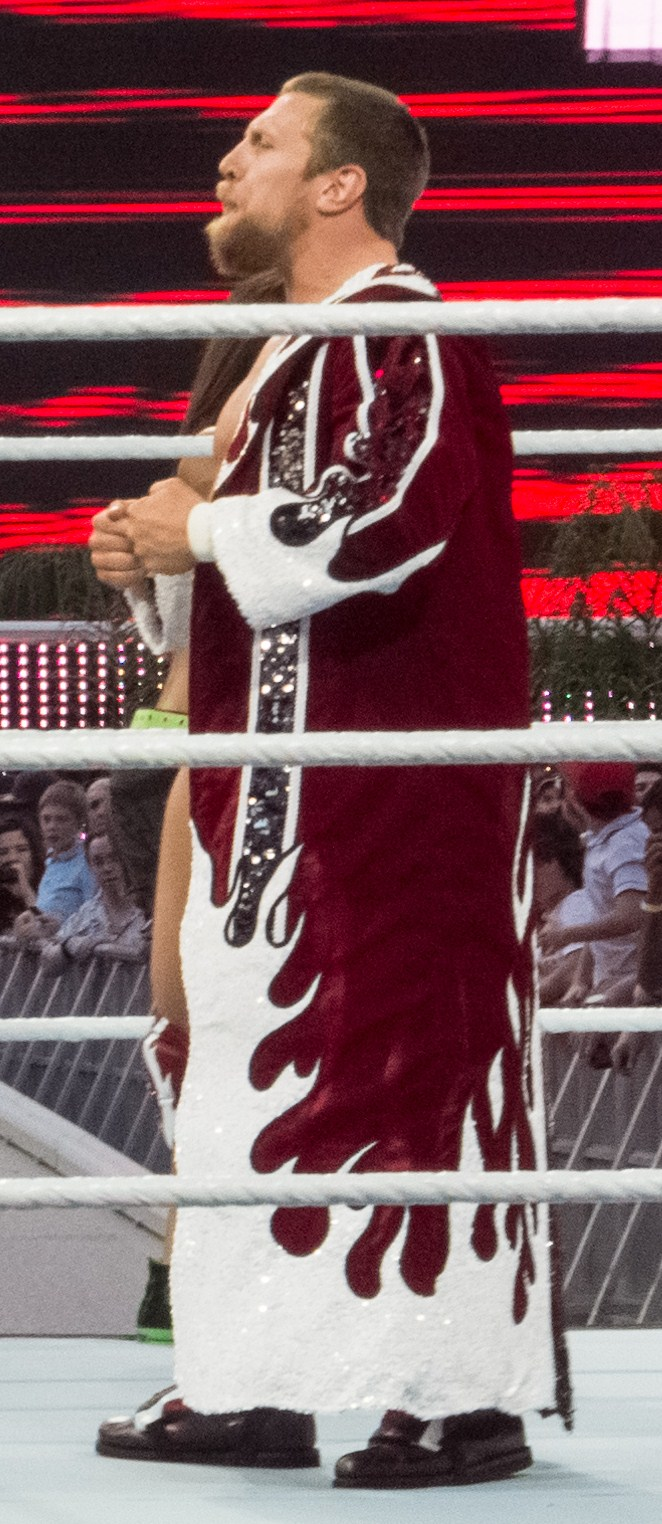
Bryan wearing a robe at WrestleMania XXVIII

Danielson has spent the majority of his career without an overt character or catchphrase in favor of becoming popular with the fans through his monikers, signature mannerisms, and wrestling ability. His attire has also varied, with the majority of his tenure spent wearing a pair of short trunks, but he also ventured into wearing a mask for a time in Japan as an extension of his American Dragon persona. He has cited a number of international wrestlers as influences to his style, including Japanese wrestlers Toshiaki Kawada and Mitsuharu Misawa and English wrestler William Regal. He has also made mention of modeling his wrestling on that of American wrestler Dean Malenko and Canadian wrestler Chris Benoit in his early career, before using Brazilian jiu-jitsu as a platform to develop his own style.

Danielson has been described as one of the greatest wrestlers of all time. Some notable parts of Danielson's persona are his mannerisms and the reactions he inspires from the crowd during the course of his matches, which include the following:

- During his time in ROH, Danielson made his way to the ring to his entrance song ("The Final Countdown") and, once in the ring, stood on the top turnbuckle and sang the refrain along with the fans in attendance. He reused the song as an entrance theme at the 2023 Forbidden Door, as well as at the 2023 All Out. His theme song in WWE was a rock variation of "Ride of the Valkyries". In AEW, his theme begins with the original version of the main theme from "Ride of the Valkyries" before going into a hip-hop variation.
- After winning the ROH World Championship, he displayed traits of a villainous persona, starting to behave more aggressively and threatening to the fans as well as taking more liberties with the rules; despite his rule-breaking character, he still retained a certain level of popularity with the fans and continued to uphold the company's Code of Honor, ROH's storyline rules of wrestler conduct, allowing him to perform as a more neutral character.
- During his initial reign as ROH World Champion, he told the ring announcer to add an extra note about him pertaining to the current circumstances around his match, which was generally insulting the crowd or his opponent.
- At the beginning of his ROH matches, the crowd would chant "you're gonna get your fucking head kicked in" at his opponents. He brought back this catchphrase during his time in AEW, with it also being present (albeit censored) in his entrance music.
- After winning WWE's World Heavyweight Championship, he began shouting "Yes!" repeatedly on his way to the ring and after defeating an opponent, crediting mixed martial artist fighter Diego Sanchez with the inspiration. This chant grew in popularity and has become his main catchphrase, being heard outside of WWE at events such as MLB, NHL, and NBA games, as well as at music concerts such as Andrew W.K. shows in Glasgow and Manchester. After turning into a villainous character at the start of 2012, he slowly turned against the fans; after WrestleMania XXVIII in April, he began chanting "No!" instead of "Yes!" He claimed that the fans were mocking him by chanting "Yes!" so he chanted "No!" back at them, but this then further encouraged the crowd to chant "Yes!" to annoy him as he was a villain. Shortly after turning back into a heroic character, he began chanting "Yes!" again, but would still shout "No!" when in a negative situation or showing disdain towards a critique, which also involved crowd participation.
- His "Yes!" chant again entered popular culture in late 2013 and early 2014. During Michigan State's regular-season victory over arch-rival Michigan, Spartans guard Travis Jackson celebrated a touchdown with a "Yes!" chant. On January 7, the university honored the football team, fresh off victory in the Rose Bowl, during halftime of the men's basketball home game against Ohio State. Jackson again led Bryan's chant, this time with the entire home crowd, especially the student section, joining in. The event quickly went viral and drew extensive coverage on ESPN's SportsCenter. One contributor to Yahoo! Sports speculated that this event and the associated media coverage led WWE to prematurely end his short-lived villainous run as a member of The Wyatt Family. In the wake of his championship victory at WrestleMania XXX, the Pittsburgh Pirates began using the "Yes!" chant as a rallying cry, gradually replacing the Zoltan gesture the Pirates had been using the previous two years; it was said that Pirates first baseman Gaby Sánchez, a huge wrestling fan, was behind the team using the "Yes!" chants. In May, members of the San Francisco Giants started using the chant and hand gesture to celebrate home runs. This led to him performing the chant at a Giants playoff game and actively supporting the team all the way to the World Series, which the Giants won against the Kansas City Royals in seven games. He was also a part of the team's victory parade. Fans of the New York Islanders now use the "Yes!" chant after every Islanders goal scored during home games.
- On several occasions, such as the 2013 Slammy Awards, fans have successfully hijacked segments with his "Yes!" chant when he was either not involved or involved only secondarily. In the case of the "Championship Ascension Ceremony" segment, the fan's continuing "Yes!" chants forced John Cena to go off-script and acknowledge Bryan (especially since the show was held in Seattle) even though the segment was supposed to be about Cena and Randy Orton's impending title unification match.
- Throughout his career, Bryan has been known as a submission specialist. In his initial run on the independent circuit, he utilized a bridging double chickenwing, named the Cattle Mutilation, to finish his opponents. This style has continued throughout his WWE career, where he used an omoplata crossface, which has been variously called either the LeBell Lock, the "No!" Lock, or the "Yes!" Lock. After his return to active performing in 2018, he began using a heel hook to finish matches.
- Shortly after capturing the WWE Championship for a fourth time by low blowing AJ Styles and turning into a villainous character at the end of 2018, Bryan changed his in-ring persona, beginning to smile more often in a sinister way and not leading any "Yes!" chants, which resulted in him receiving heat from the crowd. After Survivor Series in November of that year, he also started to repeatedly call the fans "fickle" while claiming that the "old Daniel Bryan" that the people loved and the "Yes!" movement were both dead before christening himself as the "new Daniel Bryan". His character then became an exaggerated and villainous version of his real-life personality: a militant environmentalist and vegan who constantly berated the WWE fans for their consumerism, environmental damage, and consumption of meat, as well as discussing the harm brought to animals by the farming industry. He also chastised fellow wrestlers such as Mustafa Ali for driving an SUV. Two days after the 2019 Royal Rumble, he threw the standard WWE Championship in a garbage can, bemoaning the fact it was made from leather, and introduced a new custom belt with the same design as the old one but made from entirely sustainable materials (such as the strap being made from hemp and the front and side plates carved from the wood of a "naturally fallen oak tree") to go with his new persona.

== Other media ==
Danielson was prominently featured in the Wrestling Road Diaries documentary, which was filmed in 2009 before he signed with WWE. In 2011, Danielson recorded a single with Kimya Dawson that was a tribute to wrestling legend "Captain" Lou Albano. In 2013, Danielson recorded the voice for the character Daniel Bryrock in the animated film The Flintstones & WWE: Stone Age SmackDown!, which was released on March 10, 2015. On July 21, 2015, Danielson and Craig Tello co-wrote Danielson's autobiography Yes: My Improbable Journey to the Main Event of WrestleMania. Later that year, he was one of the judges on the sixth season of Tough Enough. After his relationship with Brie Bella became a regular feature on E! Network reality series Total Divas, he became part of the cast of the spin off series Total Bellas.

In May 2016, during his first retirement, Danielson competed in an Olympic weightlifting competition in his hometown. He came in first place in his weight division, receiving a katana as his prize. Danielson has been featured in 10 WWE video games under the Daniel Bryan name, starting with WWE '12 in 2011 and most recently WWE 2K Battlegrounds in 2020. He was the alternate cover star of WWE 2K14, alongside The Rock. He made his first video game appearance under his real name in WWE 2K19, which featured a showcase story mode based on his career in WWE. Danielson made his first appearance in an AEW video game under his real name when he appeared in AEW Fight Forever in 2023.

== Personal life ==
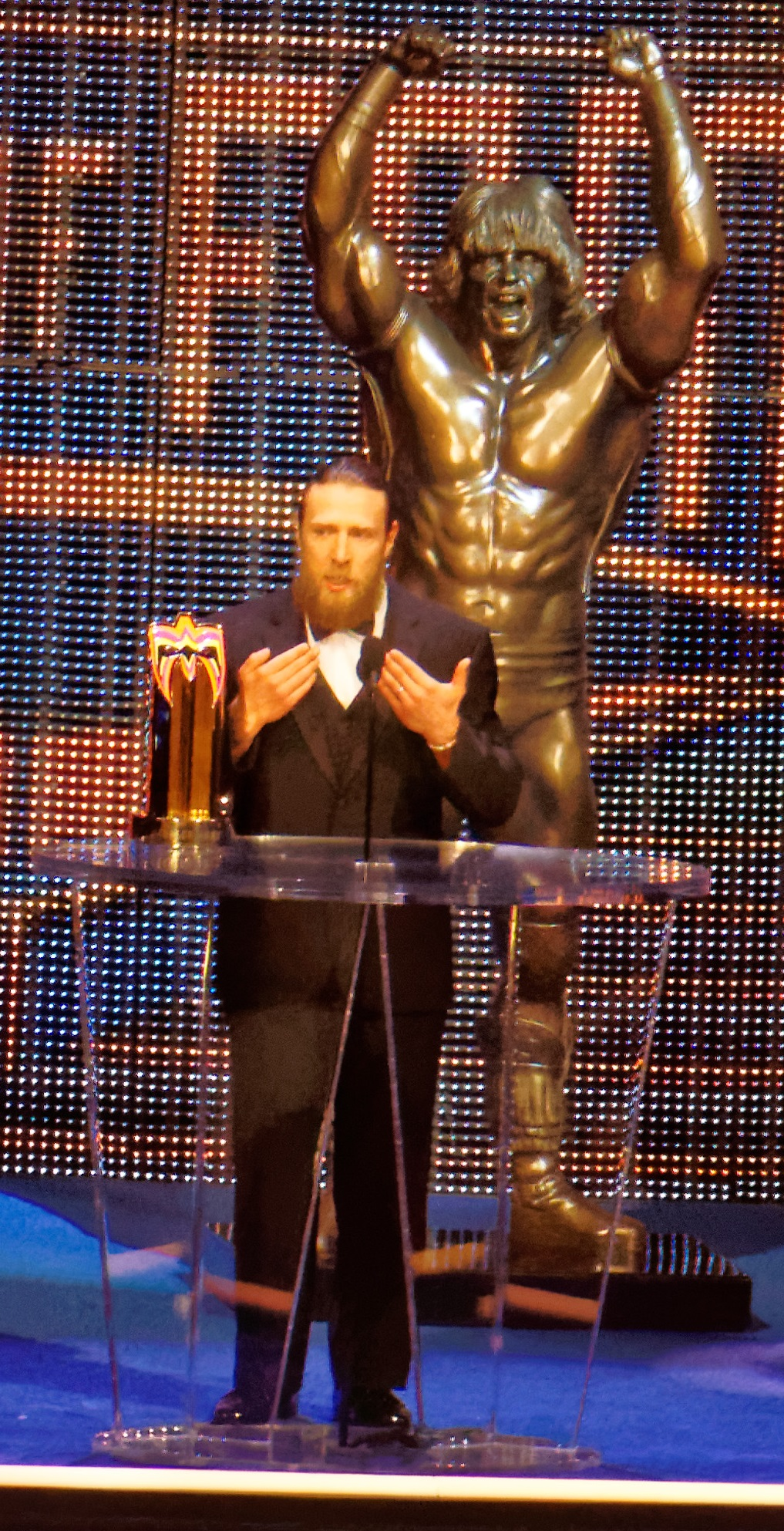
Danielson at the 2015 WWE Hall of Fame ceremony

Danielson married fellow WWE wrestler Brie Bella on April 11, 2014, after they had been dating for nearly three years. On April 6, 2016, almost two months after Danielson's retirement, Bella also semi-retired from wrestling so that the two could start a family. They have two children, born in 2017 and 2020. They reside in Napa County, California, having previously lived in Phoenix, Arizona.

Danielson originally began training in Brazilian jiu-jitsu in 2002 under Wallid Ismail. In 2009, he lived in Las Vegas, where he began training at Randy Couture's Xtreme Couture Mixed Martial Arts. He currently holds a purple belt in jiu-jitsu. He was also roommates with Xtreme Couture's head grappling trainer Neil Melanson, and had previously lived with former UFC Light Heavyweight Champion Lyoto Machida and fellow professional wrestler Shinsuke Nakamura while they trained at the Inoki Dojo in 2003.

Danielson became a vegan in 2009 after suffering from elevated liver enzymes and several staph infections. In 2012, he received PETA's Libby Award for Most Animal-Friendly Athlete. That same year, Mayor Micah Cawley of Yakima, Washington, declared January 13 "Daniel Bryan Day". Later that year, Danielson explained that he was no longer a vegan due to his inability to find sufficient vegan food while traveling with WWE. He also revealed that he had developed a soy intolerance and could not find enough non-soy vegan protein on the road, but was still maintaining a primarily vegan diet. In 2018, it was reported that he and his wife planned to raise their children as vegetarians. In 2022, he stated that he was still "very much in favor of a plant-heavy diet" but does not "stress too much if he feels like eating off-plan".

In 2011, in response to fans mistakenly pointing out what they believed was a nicotine patch on his arm, Danielson revealed that the discoloration actually stems from vitiligo. In October 2012, a social media campaign was started in an attempt to help Connor Michalek meet Danielson, his personal hero. Michalek was six years old at the time and suffered from cancer of the brain and spine. The campaign succeeded, with Danielson meeting Michalek in December 2012 and October 2013. After Michalek's death, he was posthumously awarded the Warrior Award by Danielson at the WWE 2015 Hall of Fame ceremony.

In a 2015 interview, Danielson revealed that he is a lifelong teetotaler who has never had a drink of alcohol. Danielson is a fan of the Seattle Seahawks and was given control of the team's Twitter account for a Q&A session in 2015, as well as wearing Seahawks-themed wrestling gear at WWE SummerSlam in 2018 and AEW WrestleDream in 2023. He also supports Everton FC. A self-described environmentalist and anti-consumerist, he has discussed feeling like a hypocrite for selling WWE merchandise, and endorsed Green Party nominee Jill Stein in the 2016 presidential election.

== Championships and accomplishments ==
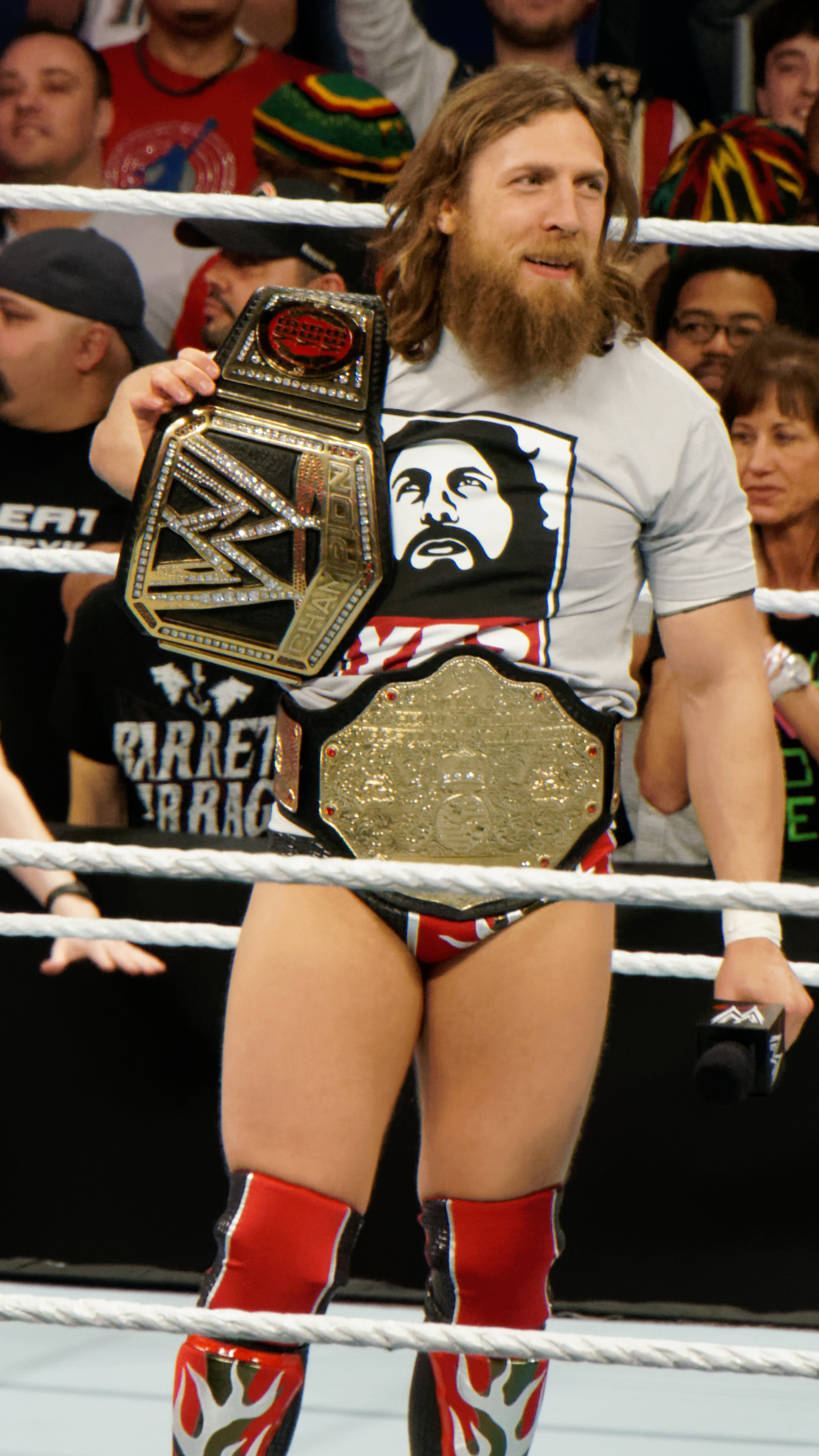
Danielson (as Daniel Bryan) was a five-time world champion in WWE—pictured here as WWE World Heavyweight Champion, then represented by the former World Heavyweight Championship belt (around his waist) and the 2013–2014 version of the WWE Championship belt (over his shoulder).

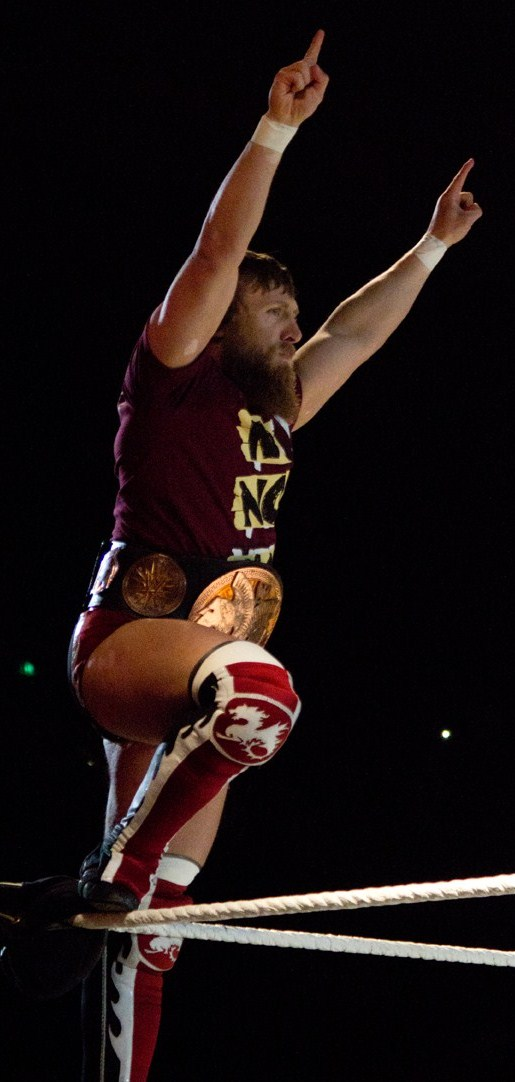
Danielson (as Daniel Bryan) found success with Kane as part of Team Hell No by capturing the WWE Tag Team Championship.

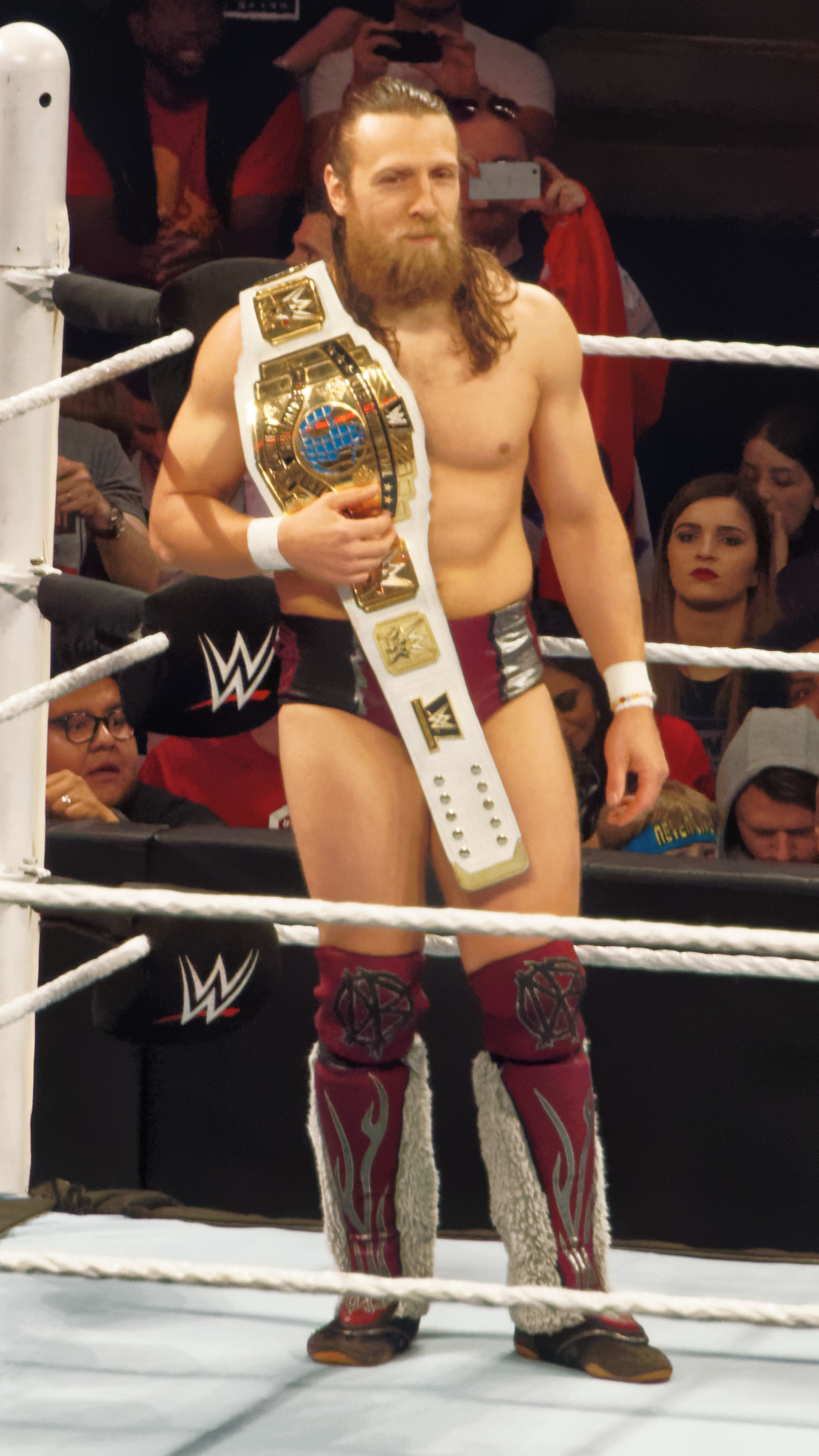
Danielson (as Daniel Bryan) is a former WWE Intercontinental Champion – the last title he held before his temporary retirement.

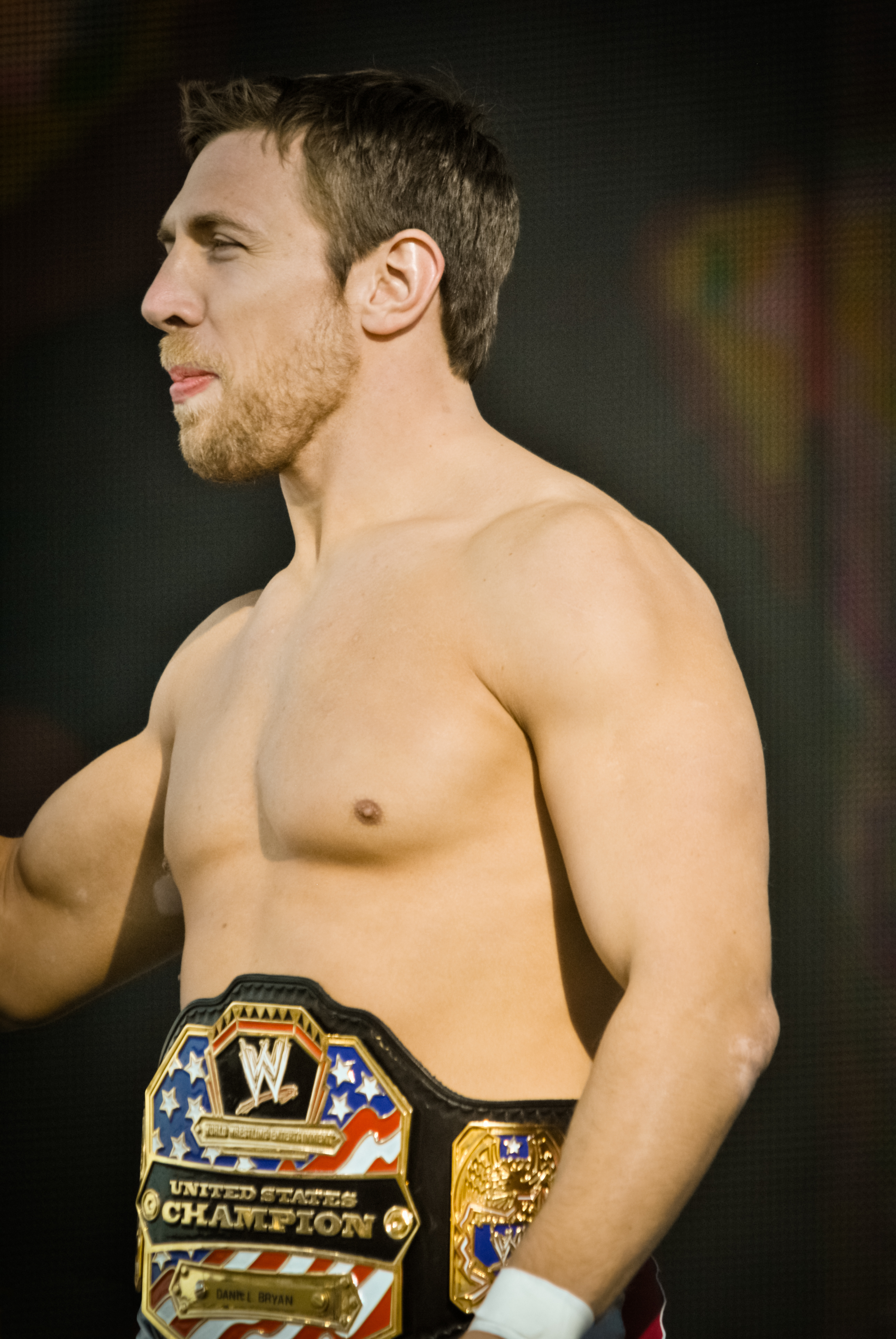
As Daniel Bryan, Danielson is a former WWE United States Champion – the first title he won in WWE.

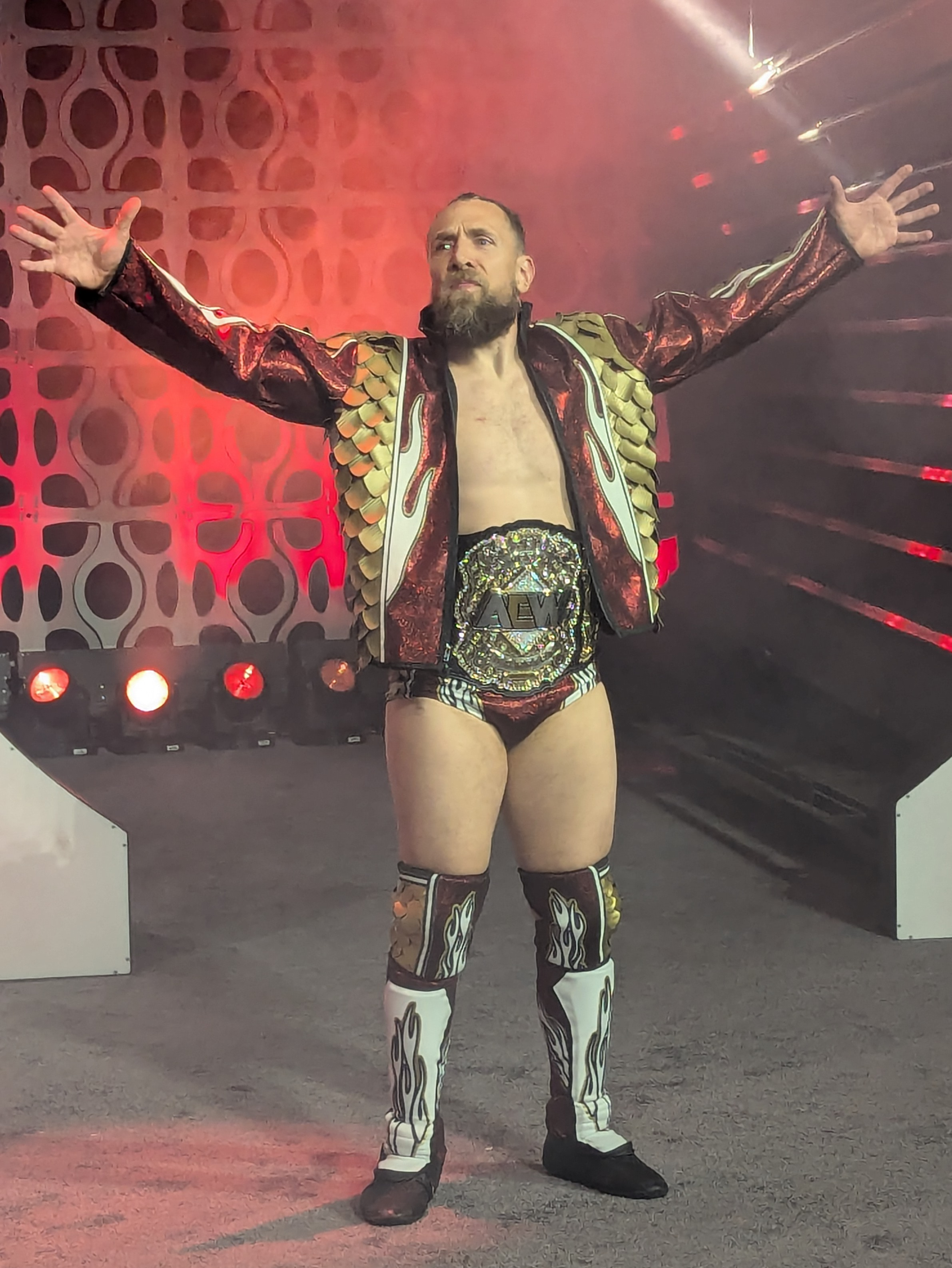
Danielson as AEW World Champion

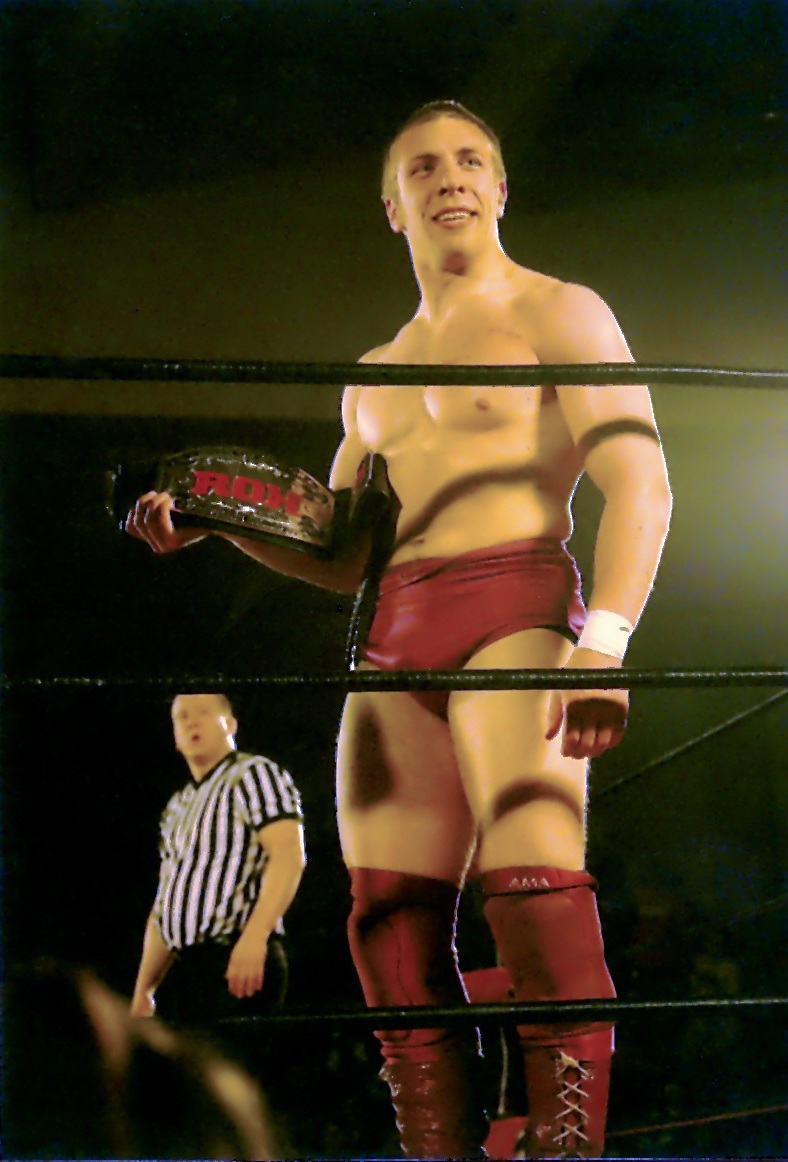
Under his American Dragon persona, Danielson is a former ROH World Champion.

- All Elite Wrestling
  - AEW World Championship (1 time)
  - AEW World Championship Eliminator Tournament (2021)
  - Owen Hart Cup (2024)
  - AEW Dynamite Awards (2 times)
    - Biggest Beatdown (2022) – 60 minute match vs. "Hangman" Adam Page
    - Biggest Surprise (2022) – debut at All Out (shared with Adam Cole)
- All Pro Wrestling
  - APW Worldwide Internet Championship (1 time)
  - King of the Indies (2001)
- All Star Wrestling
  - World Heavy-Middleweight Championship (1 time)
  - World Heavy-Middleweight Championship Tournament (2003)
- CBS Sports
  - Best Promo of the Year (2018) – Promo during TLC kickoff show
  - Comeback Wrestler of the Year (2018)
- Connecticut Wrestling Entertainment
  - CTWE Heavyweight Championship (1 time)
- East Coast Wrestling Association
  - ECWA Tag Team Championship (1 time) – with Low Ki
- ESPN
  - Match of the Year (2024) – vs. Will Ospreay at AEW Dynasty
- Evolve
  - Match of the Year (2010) vs. Munenori Sawa on September 11
- Extreme Canadian Championship Wrestling
  - NWA Canadian Junior Heavyweight Championship (1 time)
- Full Impact Pro
  - FIP Heavyweight Championship (1 time)
- International Catch Wrestling Alliance
  - Expo Tournament (2008)
- International Wrestling Association
  - IWA Puerto Rico Heavyweight Championship (1 time)
- Memphis Championship Wrestling
  - MCW Southern Light Heavyweight Championship (1 time)
  - MCW Southern Tag Team Championship (1 time) – with Spanky
- NWA Mid-South
  - NWA Southern Junior Heavyweight Championship (1 time)
- New Japan Pro-Wrestling
  - IWGP Junior Heavyweight Tag Team Championship (1 time) – with Curry Man
  - Best of the American Super Juniors (2004)
- Pro Wrestling Guerrilla
  - PWG World Championship (2 times)
- Pro Wrestling Illustrated
  - Comeback of the Year (2018)
  - Feud of the Year (2013) vs. The Authority
  - Inspirational Wrestler of the Year (2014)
  - Match of the Year (2013) vs. John Cena at SummerSlam
  - Most Popular Wrestler of the Year (2013)
  - Wrestler of the Year (2013)
  - Ranked No. 1 of the top 500 wrestlers in the PWI 500 in 2014
- Pro Wrestling Noah
  - GHC Junior Heavyweight Championship (1 time)
- Ring of Honor
  - ROH Pure Championship (1 time)
  - ROH World Championship (1 time)
  - Survival of the Fittest (2004)
  - ROH Year-End Award (2 times)
    - Wrestler of the Year (2007)
    - Match of the Year (2007) vs. Takeshi Morishima (Manhattan Mayhem II)
  - ROH Hall of Fame (Class of 2022)
- Sports Illustrated
  - Ranked No. 10 of the top 10 men's wrestlers in 2018
  - Ranked No. 5 of the top 10 wrestlers in 2021
- Texas Wrestling Alliance
  - TWA Tag Team Championship (1 time) – with Spanky
- Texas Wrestling Entertainment
  - TWE Heavyweight Championship (1 time)
- Westside Xtreme Wrestling
  - wXw World Heavyweight Championship (1 time)
  - Ambition 1 (2010)
- World Series Wrestling
  - WSW Heavyweight Championship (1 time)
- World Wrestling Entertainment/WWE
  - WWE Championship (4 times)
  - World Heavyweight Championship (1 time)
  - WWE Intercontinental Championship (1 time)
  - WWE United States Championship (1 time)
  - WWE Tag Team Championship (1 time) – with Kane
  - WWE SmackDown Tag Team Championship (1 time) – with Rowan
  - Money in the Bank (SmackDown 2011)
  - Match of the Year (2019) vs. Kofi Kingston at WrestleMania 35
  - 26th Triple Crown Champion
  - Sixth Grand Slam Champion (under current format; 15th overall)
  - Slammy Award (12 times)
    - Beard of the Year (2013)
    - Catchphrase of the Year (2013) – YES! YES! YES!
    - Cole in Your Stocking (2010) – attacking Michael Cole on NXT
    - Couple of the Year (2013, 2014) – with Brie Bella
    - Facial Hair of the Year (2012)
    - Fan Participation of the Year (2013) – YES! chants
    - Rivalry of the Year (2014) vs. The Authority
    - Shocker of the Year (2010) – The Nexus' debut
    - Superstar of the Year (2013)
    - Tweet of the Year (2012) – "Goat face is a horrible insult. My face is practically perfect in every way. In fact, from now on I demand to be called Beautiful Bryan"
    - Upset of the Year (2012) – defeating Mark Henry and Big Show at the Royal Rumble
- Wrestling Observer Newsletter
  - Best Non-Wrestler (2017)
  - Best on Interviews (2018)
  - Best Pro Wrestling Book (2015) – Yes: My Improbable Journey to the Main Event of WrestleMania with Craig Tello
  - Best Pro Wrestling DVD (2015) – Daniel Bryan: Just Say Yes! Yes! Yes!
  - Best Technical Wrestler (2005–2013, 2021–2023, award renamed to Bryan Danielson Award in recognition)
  - Pro Wrestling Match of the Year (2007) vs. Takeshi Morishima at ROH Manhattan Mayhem II
  - Pro Wrestling Match of the Year (2024) vs. Will Ospreay on April 21 at Dynasty
  - Most Outstanding Wrestler (2006–2010)
  - Most Outstanding Wrestler of the Decade (2000–2009)
  - Wrestling Observer Newsletter Hall of Fame (Class of 2016)
  - Best Television Announcer (2025)

=== Other awards and honors ===
- PETA Libby Award for Most Animal-Friendly Athlete (2012)

== Bibliography ==
- Yes: My Improbable Journey to the Main Event of WrestleMania (St. Martin's Press, 2015, Hardcover) ISBN 1-25006-788-X, ISBN 978-1250067883
