= Chromosome 5 =

Human chromosome

- Human chromosome 5 pair after G-banding. One is from mother, one is from father.

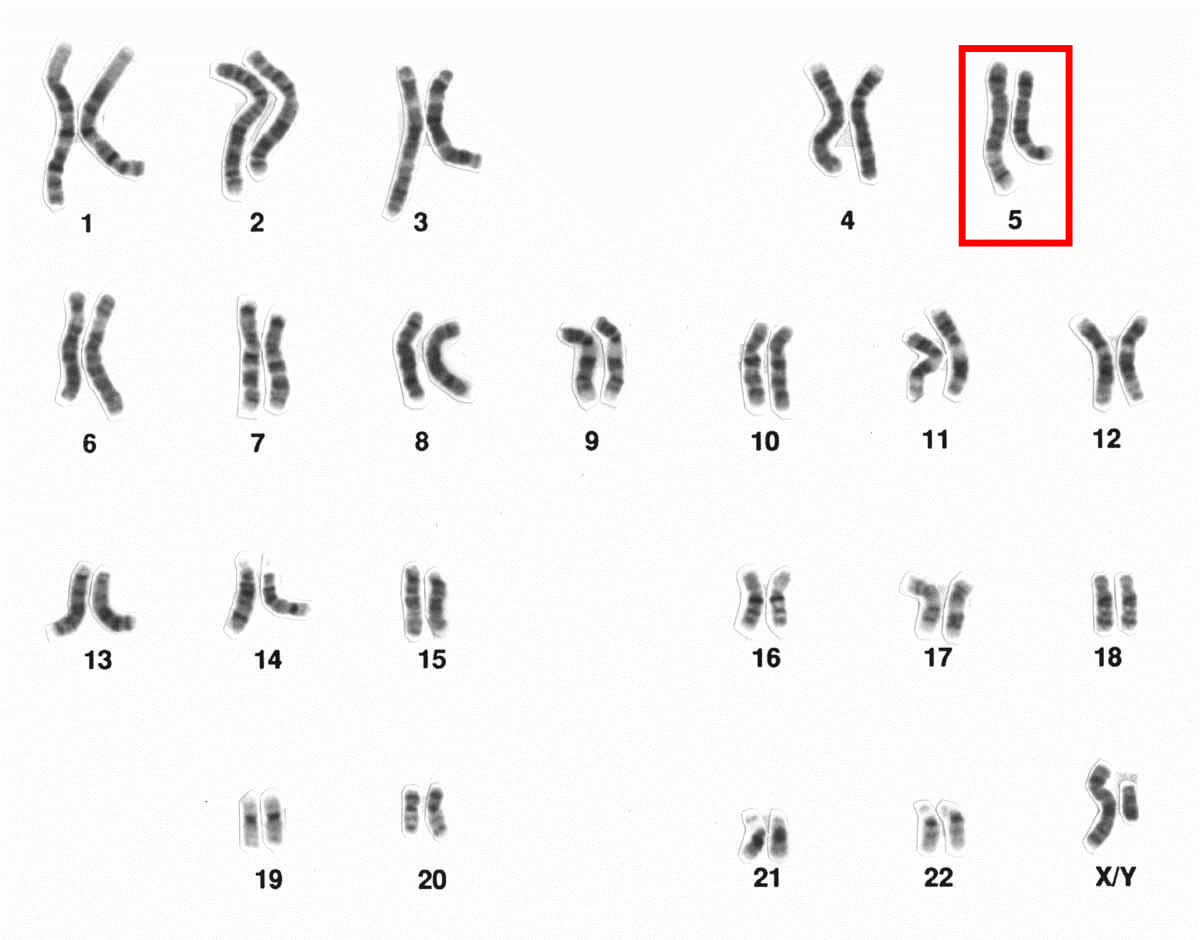
- Chromosome 5 pair in human male karyogram.

Features
- Length (bp): 182,045,439 bp (CHM13)
- No. of genes: 839 (CCDS)
- Type: Autosome
- Centromere position: Submetacentric (48.8 Mbp)

Complete gene lists
- CCDS: Gene list
- HGNC: Gene list
- UniProt: Gene list
- NCBI: Gene list

External map viewers
- Ensembl: Chromosome 5
- Entrez: Chromosome 5
- NCBI: Chromosome 5
- UCSC: Chromosome 5

Full DNA sequences
- RefSeq: NC_000005 (FASTA)
- GenBank: CM000667 (FASTA)

Chromosome 5 is one of the 23 pairs of chromosomes in humans. People normally have two copies of this chromosome. Chromosome 5 spans about 182 million base pairs (the building blocks of DNA) and represents almost 6% of the total DNA in cells. Chromosome 5 is the 5th largest human chromosome, yet has one of the lowest gene densities. This is partially explained by numerous gene-poor regions that display a remarkable degree of non-coding and syntenic conservation with non-mammalian vertebrates, suggesting they are functionally constrained.

Because chromosome 5 is responsible for many forms of growth and development (cell divisions) changes may cause cancers. One example would be acute myeloid leukemia (AML).

== Genes ==
=== Number of genes ===
The following are some of the gene count estimates of human chromosome 5. Because researchers use different approaches to genome annotation their predictions of the number of genes on each chromosome varies (for technical details, see gene prediction). Among various projects, the collaborative consensus coding sequence project (CCDS) takes an extremely conservative strategy. So CCDS's gene number prediction represents a lower bound on the total number of human protein-coding genes.

Estimated by	Protein-coding genes	Non-coding RNA genes	Pseudogenes	Source	Release date
CCDS	839	—	—		2016-09-08
HGNC	790	355	574		2017-05-12
Ensembl	882	1,207	707		2017-03-29
UniProt	875	—	—		2018-02-28
NCBI	886	981	785		2017-05-19

=== Gene list ===
The following is a partial list of genes on human chromosome 5. For complete list, see the link in the infobox on the right.

- ABLIM3: encoding protein Actin-binding LIM protein 3
- ADAMTS2: ADAM metallopeptidase with thrombospondin type 1 motif, 2
- AGXT2: Alanine-glyoxylate aminotransferase 2
- ANKRD31: encoding protein Ankyrin repeat domain 31
- APBB3: encoding protein Amyloid beta A4 precursor protein-binding family B member 3
- APC: adenomatosis polyposis coli
- ARL15: encoding protein ADP-ribosylation factor-like 15
- BRIX1: Ribosome biogenesis protein BRX1 homolog (also BXDC2)
- C1QTNF3: Complement C1q tumor necrosis factor-related protein 3
- C5orf45: Chromosome 5 open reading frame 45
- C5orf47: encoding protein Chromosome 5 open reading frame 47
- CAST: Calpastatin
- CFAP90: Cilia- and flagella-associated protein 90
- CDO1: encoding protein Cysteine dioxygenase type 1
- CPLANE1: Ciliogenesis And Planar Polarity Effector 1
- CPLX2: Complexin-2
- CREBRF: encoding protein CREB3 regulatory factor
- CXXC5: CXXC-type zing finger protein 5
- DPYSL3: Dihydropyrimidinase-like protein 3
- EGR1: early growth response protein 1
- ERAP1: endoplasmic reticulum aminopeptidase 1 (previously called ARTS-1)
- ERAP2: endoplasmic reticulum aminopeptidase 2
- ESM1: Endothelial cell-specific molecule 1
- DTDST: diastrophic dysplasia sulfate transporter
- EIF4E1B: encoding protein Eukaryotic translation initiation factor 4E family member 1B
- ERCC8: excision repair cross-complementing rodent repair deficiency, complementation group 8
- FAF2: encoding protein Fas associated factor family member 2
- FAM172A: encoding protein UPF0528 protein FAM172A
- FAM105B: encoding protein Family with sequence similarity 105, member B
- FAM114A2: encoding protein FAM114A2
- FAM71B: encoding protein Family with sequence similarity 71 member B
- FASTKD3: FAST kinase domain-containing protein 3
- FBXL7: F-box/LRR-repeat protein 7
- FCHSD1: FCH and double SH3 domain protein 1
- FGF1: fibroblast growth factor 1 (acidic fibroblast growth factor)
- FGFR4: fibroblast growth factor receptor 4
- GM2A: GM2 ganglioside activator
- GNPDA1: Glucosamine-6-phosphate isomerase 1
- GPBP1: Vasculin
- HEXB: hexosaminidase B (beta polypeptide)
- HMGXB3: encoding protein HMG-box containing 3
- IK: Protein Red
- IRX1: Iroquois-class homeodomain protein (human)
- LARP1: La-related protein 1
- LMAN2: Lectin mannose binding 2
- LNCR3 encoding protein Lung cancer susceptibility 3
- LPCAT1: Lysophosphatidylcholine acyltransferase 1
- LYRM7: encoding protein LYR motif containing 7
- LYSMD3: LysM and putative peptidoglycan-binding domain-containing protein 3
- MAN2A1: Alpha-mannosidase 2
- MASS1: monogenic, audiogenic seizure susceptibility 1 homolog (mouse)
- MCC: Colorectal mutant cancer protein
- MCCC2: methylcrotonoyl-Coenzyme A carboxylase 2 (beta)
- MCEF: transcription factor AF4/FMR2 family, member 4
- MEF2C: Myocyte-specific enhancer factor 2C
- MEF2C-AS1: encoding protein MEF2C antisense RNA 1
- MGAT1: Mannosyl (alpha-1,3-)-glycoprotein beta-1,2-N-acetylglucosaminyltransferase
- MINAR2: encoding protein Kiaa1024 like
- MIR1271: encoding MicroRNA 1271
- MIR146A: microRNA 146a
- MTRR: 5-methyltetrahydrofolate-homocysteine methyltransferase reductase
- MZB1: Marginal zone B and B1 cell-specific protein
- NIPBL: Nipped-B homolog (Drosophila)
- NREP: Neuronal regeneration related protein
- NSA2 encoding protein TGF beta-inducible nuclear protein 1
- NSD1: Transcription coregulator protein
- NSUN2: NOP2/Sun domain family, member 2
- NR2F1: Nuclear hormone receptor
- NSG2: encoding protein Hmp19 protein
- NUDCD2: NudC domain-containing protein 2
- P4HA2: Prolyl 4-hydroxylase subunit alpha-2
- PCBD2: Pterin-4-alpha-carbinolamine dehydratase 2
- PELO: Pelota homolog
- PGGT1B: encoding protein Protein geranylgeranyltransferase type I subunit beta
- PHAX: Phosphorylated adapter for RNA export
- Pikachurin: Responsible for the functioning of the ribbon synapses; allows the eye to track moving objects
- PFDN1: Prefoldin subunit 1
- POLR3G: encoding protein Polymerase (RNA) III (DNA directed) polypeptide G (32kD)
- PPIP5K2: Diphosphoinositol pentakisphosphate kinase 2
- PRCC1: Proline-rich coiled coil 1
- PRR16: encoding protein Proline-rich protein 16
- PURA: Purine-rich element-binding protein A
- PWWP2A: encoding protein PWWP domain containing 2A
- RANBP3L: encoding protein RAN binding protein 3-like
- RASGEF1C: encoding protein RasGEF domain family member 1C
- RMND5B: Required for meiotic nuclear division 5 homolog B
- SFXN1: Sideroflexin-1
- SKIV2L2: Ski2 like RNA helicase 2
- SLC22A5: solute carrier family 22 (organic cation transporter), member 5
- SLC26A2: solute carrier family 26 (sulfate transporter), member 2
- SH3TC2: domain and tetratricopeptide repeats 2
- SLCO4C1: Solute carrier organic anion transporter family member 4c1
- SLU7: pre-mRNA-splicing factor SLU7
- SMN1: survival motor neuron 1, telomeric
- SMN2: survival motor neuron 2, centromeric
- SNCAIP: synuclein, alpha interacting protein (synphilin)
- SPEF2: Sperm flagellar protein 2
- SPINK5: serine protease inhibitor Kazal-type 5 (LEKTI)
- SPINK6: serine protease inhibitor Kazal-type 6
- SPINK9: serine protease inhibitor Kazal-type 9 (LEKTI-2)
- SPZ1: Spermatogenic leucine zipper protein 1
- STC2: Stanniocalcin-2
- TBCA: Tubulin-specific chaperone A
- TCOF1: Treacher Collins-Franceschetti syndrome 1
- TGFBI: keratoepithelin
- THG1L: Probable tRNA(His) guanylyltransferase
- TICAM2: TIR domain-containing adapter molecule 2
- TMEM171: encoding protein Transmembrane protein 171
- TNFAIP8: Tumor necrosis factor, alpha-induced protein 8
- TSSK1B: encoding protein Testis specific serine kinase 1b
- TTC37: Tetratricopeptide repeat domain 37
- UPF0488: encodes G protein-coupled receptor protein signaling pathway
- YIPF5: Yip1 domain family member 5
- YTHDC2: encoding protein YTH domain containing 2
- ZBED3: Zinc finger BED domain-containing protein 3
- ZNF608: encoding protein Zinc finger protein 608

== Diseases and disorders ==
The following are some of the diseases related to genes located on chromosome 5:

- Attention-deficit/hyperactivity disorder
- Achondrogenesis type 1B
- Atelosteogenesis, type II
- Bipolar disorder
- Bosch-Boonstra-Schaaf optic atrophy syndrome
- Charcot–Marie–Tooth disease, type 4
- Cockayne syndrome
- Cornelia de Lange syndrome
- Corneal dystrophy of Bowman layer
- Cri du chat
- Diastrophic dysplasia
- Ehlers–Danlos syndrome
- Familial adenomatous polyposis
- Granular corneal dystrophy type I
- Granular corneal dystrophy type II
- GM2-gangliosidosis, AB variant
- Homocystinuria
- 3-Methylcrotonyl-CoA carboxylase deficiency
- Myelodysplastic syndrome
- Netherton syndrome
- Nicotine dependency
- Parkinson's disease
- Primary carnitine deficiency
- Recessive multiple epiphyseal dysplasia
- Sandhoff disease
- Spinal muscular atrophy
- Sotos Syndrome
- Survival motor neuron spinal muscular atrophy
- Treacher Collins syndrome
- Tricho-hepato-enteric syndrome
- Usher syndrome

== Chromosomal conditions ==
The following conditions are caused by changes in the structure or number of copies of chromosome 5:

- Cri-du-chat syndrome is caused by a deletion of the end of the short (p) arm of chromosome 5. This chromosomal change is written as 5p-. The signs and symptoms of cri-du-chat syndrome are probably related to the loss of multiple genes in this region. Researchers have not identified all of these genes or determined how their loss leads to the features of the disorder. They have discovered, however, that a larger deletion tends to result in more severe intellectual disability and developmental delays in people with cri-du-chat syndrome.

Researchers have defined narrow regions of the short arm of chromosome 5 that are associated with particular features of cri-du-chat syndrome. A specific region designated 5p15.3 is associated with a cat-like cry, and a nearby region called 5p15.2 is associated with mental retardation, small head (microcephaly), and distinctive facial features.

- Familial Adenomatous Polyposis is caused by a deletion of the APC tumor suppressor gene on the long (q) arm of chromosome 5. This chromosomal change results in thousands of colonic polyps which gives the patient a 100% risk of colon cancer if total colectomy is not done.
- Chromosome 5q deletion syndrome is caused by the deletion of the q arm (long arm) of chromosome 5. This deletion has been linked to several blood related disorders including Myelodysplastic syndrome and Erythroblastopenia. This is a different condition than Cri-du-chat which was mentioned above.
- Other changes in the number or structure of chromosome 5 can have a variety of effects, including delayed growth and development, distinctive facial features, birth defects, and other medical problems. Changes to chromosome 5 include an extra segment of the short (p) or long (q) arm of the chromosome in each cell (partial trisomy 5p or 5q), a missing segment of the long arm of the chromosome in each cell (partial monosomy 5q), and a circular structure called ring chromosome 5. A ring chromosome occurs when both ends of a broken chromosome are reunited.

== Cytogenetic band ==
G-banding ideograms of human chromosome 5

G-banding ideogram of human chromosome 5 in resolution 850 bphs. Band length in this diagram is proportional to base-pair length. This type of ideogram is generally used in genome browsers (e.g. Ensembl, UCSC Genome Browser).

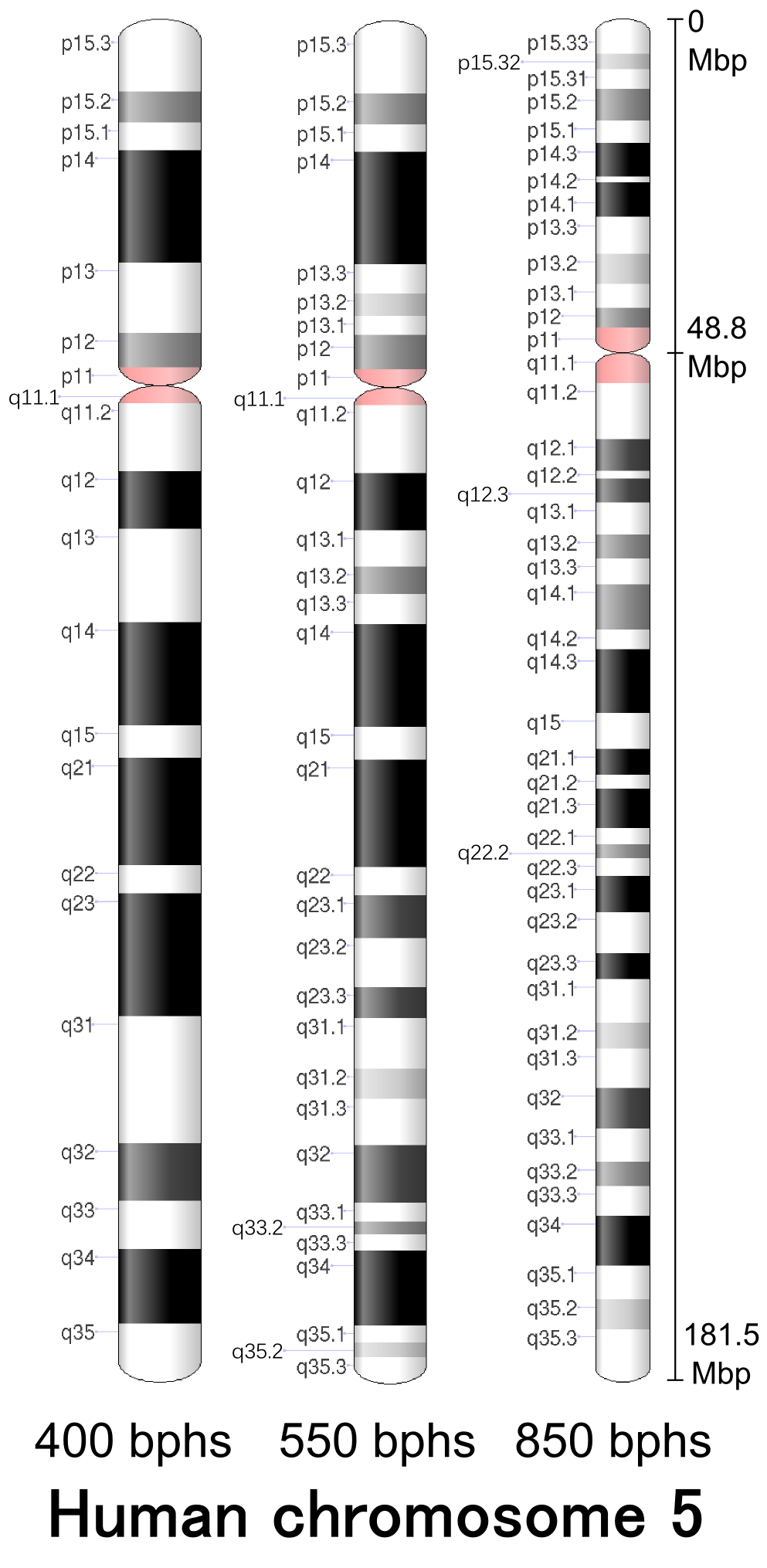
G-banding patterns of human chromosome 5 in three different resolutions (400, 550 and 850). Band length in this diagram is based on the ideograms from ISCN (2013). This type of ideogram represents actual relative band length observed under a microscope at the different moments during the mitotic process.

G-bands of human chromosome 5 in resolution 850 bphs
Chr.	Arm	Band	ISCN start	ISCN stop	Basepair start	Basepair stop	Stain	Density
5	p	15.33	0	278	1	4,400,000	gneg	
5	p	15.32	278	401	4,400,001	6,300,000	gpos	25
5	p	15.31	401	555	6,300,001	9,900,000	gneg	
5	p	15.2	555	802	9,900,001	15,000,000	gpos	50
5	p	15.1	802	972	15,000,001	18,400,000	gneg	
5	p	14.3	972	1234	18,400,001	23,300,000	gpos	100
5	p	14.2	1234	1281	23,300,001	24,600,000	gneg	
5	p	14.1	1281	1543	24,600,001	28,900,000	gpos	100
5	p	13.3	1543	1836	28,900,001	33,800,000	gneg	
5	p	13.2	1836	2068	33,800,001	38,400,000	gpos	25
5	p	13.1	2068	2253	38,400,001	42,500,000	gneg	
5	p	12	2253	2407	42,500,001	46,100,000	gpos	50
5	p	11	2407	2592	46,100,001	48,800,000	acen	
5	q	11.1	2592	2839	48,800,001	51,400,000	acen	
5	q	11.2	2839	3271	51,400,001	59,600,000	gneg	
5	q	12.1	3271	3518	59,600,001	63,600,000	gpos	75
5	q	12.2	3518	3580	63,600,001	63,900,000	gneg	
5	q	12.3	3580	3765	63,900,001	67,400,000	gpos	75
5	q	13.1	3765	4012	67,400,001	69,100,000	gneg	
5	q	13.2	4012	4197	69,100,001	74,000,000	gpos	50
5	q	13.3	4197	4397	74,000,001	77,600,000	gneg	
5	q	14.1	4397	4752	77,600,001	82,100,000	gpos	50
5	q	14.2	4752	4907	82,100,001	83,500,000	gneg	
5	q	14.3	4907	5400	83,500,001	93,000,000	gpos	100
5	q	15	5400	5678	93,000,001	98,900,000	gneg	
5	q	21.1	5678	5879	98,900,001	103,400,000	gpos	100
5	q	21.2	5879	5987	103,400,001	105,100,000	gneg	
5	q	21.3	5987	6295	105,100,001	110,200,000	gpos	100
5	q	22.1	6295	6419	110,200,001	112,200,000	gneg	
5	q	22.2	6419	6527	112,200,001	113,800,000	gpos	50
5	q	22.3	6527	6666	113,800,001	115,900,000	gneg	
5	q	23.1	6666	6943	115,900,001	122,100,000	gpos	100
5	q	23.2	6943	7267	122,100,001	127,900,000	gneg	
5	q	23.3	7267	7468	127,900,001	131,200,000	gpos	100
5	q	31.1	7468	7807	131,200,001	136,900,000	gneg	
5	q	31.2	7807	8008	136,900,001	140,100,000	gpos	25
5	q	31.3	8008	8316	140,100,001	145,100,000	gneg	
5	q	32	8316	8625	145,100,001	150,400,000	gpos	75
5	q	33.1	8625	8887	150,400,001	153,300,000	gneg	
5	q	33.2	8887	9072	153,300,001	156,300,000	gpos	50
5	q	33.3	9072	9304	156,300,001	160,500,000	gneg	
5	q	34	9304	9690	160,500,001	169,000,000	gpos	100
5	q	35.1	9690	9952	169,000,001	173,300,000	gneg	
5	q	35.2	9952	10183	173,300,001	177,100,000	gpos	25
5	q	35.3	10183	10600	177,100,001	181,538,259	gneg	
