= PFDN1 =

Protein-coding gene in the species Homo sapiens

Identifiers
- Aliases: PFDN1, PDF, PFD1, prefoldin subunit 1
- External IDs: OMIM: 604897; MGI: 1914449; HomoloGene: 37644; GeneCards: PFDN1; OMA:PFDN1 - orthologs

Gene location (Human)
Chr.	Chromosome 5 (human)
Band	5q31.3	Start	140,245,035 bp
Band	5q31.3	End	140,303,113 bp

Gene location (Mouse)
Chr.	Chromosome 18 (mouse)
Band	18|18 B2	Start	36,536,729 bp
Band	18|18 B2	End	36,587,577 bp
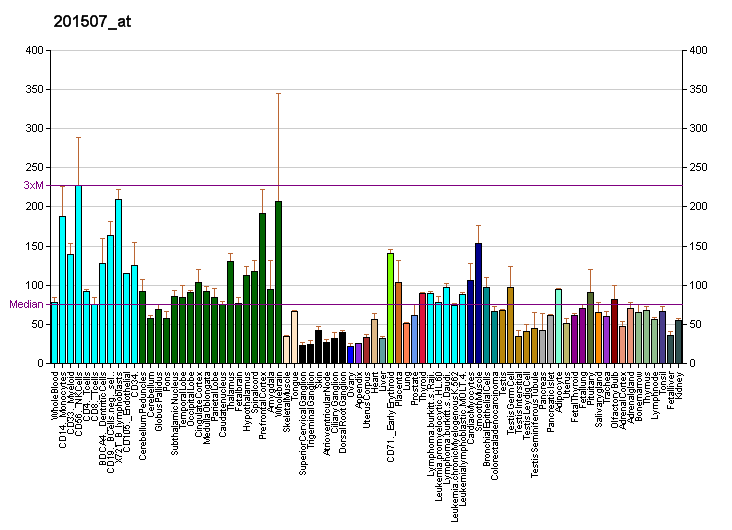
RNA expression pattern
Bgee	Human / Mouse (ortholog); Top expressed in: Achilles tendon; ganglionic eminence; ventricular zone; muscle of thigh; islet of Langerhans; gonad; prefrontal cortex; C1 segment; apex of heart; right frontal lobe / Top expressed in: ventromedial nucleus; mammillary body; lateral hypothalamus; lateral septal nucleus; facial motor nucleus; external carotid artery; maxillary prominence; anterior amygdaloid area; lateral geniculate nucleus; arcuate nucleus; More reference expression data
BioGPS	More reference expression data
Gene ontology
Molecular function	DNA-binding transcription factor activity; unfolded protein binding; protein folding chaperone activity
Cellular component	prefoldin complex; cytoplasm
Biological process	regulation of transcription, DNA-templated; protein folding; cytoskeleton organization
Sources:Amigo / QuickGO
Orthologs
Species	Human	Mouse
Entrez	5201	67199
Ensembl	ENSG00000113068	ENSMUSG00000024346
UniProt	O60925	Q9CWM4; Q9CQF7
RefSeq (mRNA)	NM_002622	NM_026027
RefSeq (protein)	NP_002613	NP_080303
Location (UCSC)	Chr 5: 140.25 – 140.3 Mb	Chr 18: 36.54 – 36.59 Mb
PubMed search
- Wikidata
View/Edit Human	View/Edit Mouse

Prefoldin subunit 1 is a protein that in humans is encoded by the PFDN1 gene.

This gene encodes a member of the prefoldin beta subunit family. The encoded protein is one of six subunits of prefoldin, a molecular chaperone complex that binds and stabilizes newly synthesized polypeptides, allowing them to fold correctly. The complex, consisting of two alpha and four beta subunits, forms a double beta barrel assembly with six protruding coiled coils.
