= NREP =

Protein-coding gene in the species Homo sapiens

Identifiers
- Aliases: NREP, C5orf13, D4S114, P311, PRO1873, PTZ17, SEZ17, neuronal regeneration related protein
- External IDs: OMIM: 607332; MGI: 99444; HomoloGene: 70874; GeneCards: NREP; OMA:NREP - orthologs

Gene location (Human)
Chr.	Chromosome 5 (human)
Band	5q22.1	Start	111,662,621 bp
Band	5q22.1	End	111,997,464 bp

Gene location (Mouse)
Chr.	Chromosome 18 (mouse)
Band	18|18 B1	Start	33,570,072 bp
Band	18|18 B1	End	33,597,082 bp
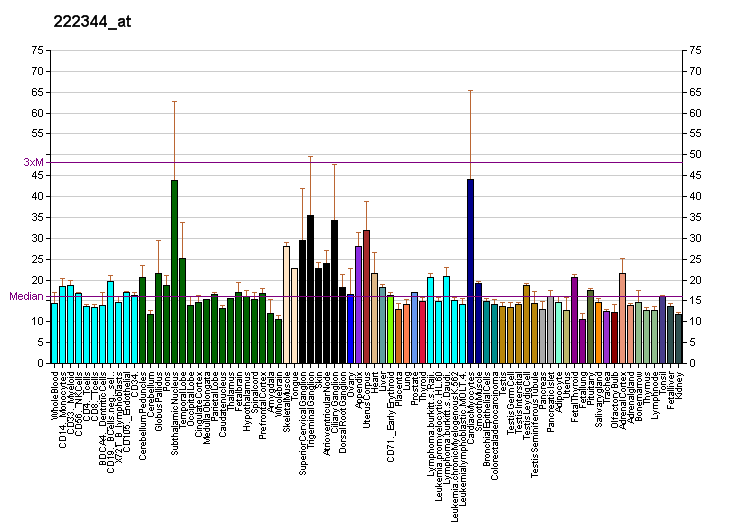

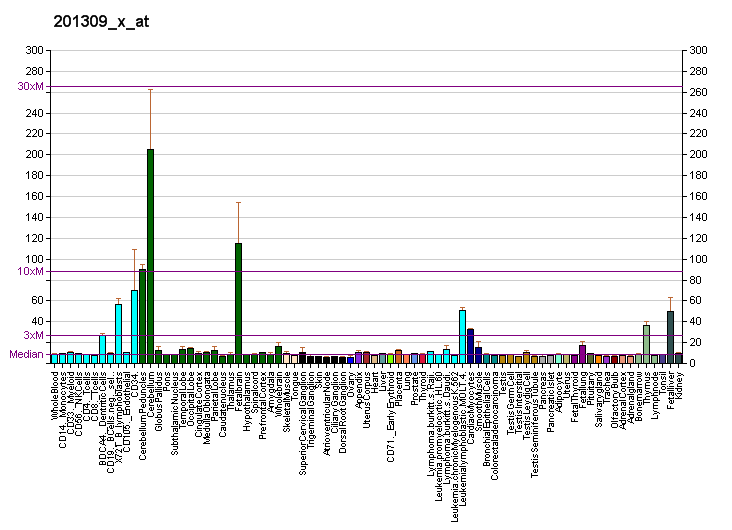

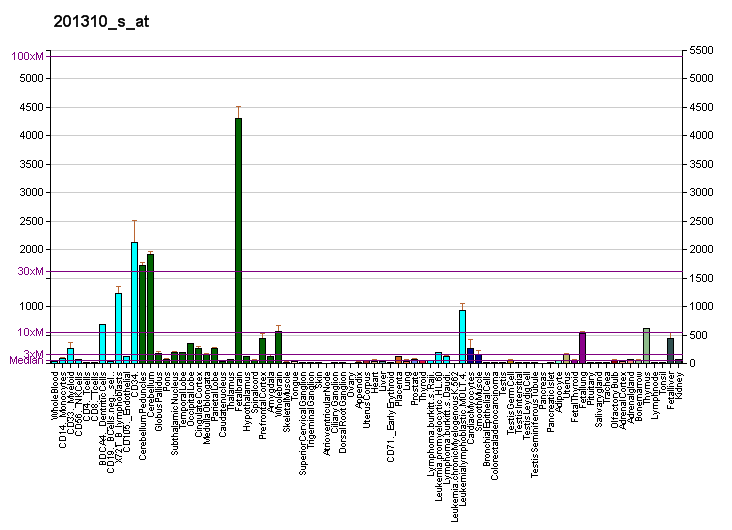
RNA expression pattern
Bgee	Human / Mouse (ortholog); Top expressed in: paraflocculus of cerebellum; ganglionic eminence; tibia; ventricular zone; right hemisphere of cerebellum; pons; Brodmann area 46; cartilage tissue; frontal pole; tendon of biceps brachii / Top expressed in: external carotid artery; vestibular sensory epithelium; cerebellar vermis; Rostral migratory stream; Gonadal ridge; lobe of cerebellum; fossa; barrel cortex; condyle; internal carotid artery; More reference expression data
BioGPS	More reference expression data
Gene ontology
Molecular function	protein binding
Cellular component	cytoplasm; nucleus
Biological process	regulation of neuron differentiation; axon regeneration; regulation of transforming growth factor beta receptor signaling pathway
Sources:Amigo / QuickGO
Orthologs
Species	Human	Mouse
Entrez	9315	27528
Ensembl	ENSG00000134986	ENSMUSG00000042834
UniProt	Q16612	Q07475
RefSeq (mRNA)	NM_001142474; NM_001142475; NM_001142476; NM_001142477; NM_001142478 NM_001142479; NM_001142480; NM_001142481; NM_001142482; NM_001142483; NM_004772	NM_001109988; NM_001109989; NM_001267717; NM_053078
RefSeq (protein)	NP_001135946; NP_001135947; NP_001135948; NP_001135949; NP_001135950 NP_001135951; NP_001135952; NP_001135953; NP_001135954; NP_001135955; NP_004763	NP_001103458; NP_001103459; NP_001254646; NP_444308
Location (UCSC)	Chr 5: 111.66 – 112 Mb	Chr 18: 33.57 – 33.6 Mb
PubMed search
- Wikidata
View/Edit Human	View/Edit Mouse

Neuronal protein 3.1 is a protein that in humans is encoded by the NREP gene. It is highly expressed in the brain.
