= MZB1 =

Protein-coding gene in the species Homo sapiens

Identifiers
- Aliases: MZB1, MEDA-7, PACAP, pERp1, marginal zone B and B1 cell specific protein
- External IDs: OMIM: 609447; MGI: 1917066; HomoloGene: 12333; GeneCards: MZB1; OMA:MZB1 - orthologs

Gene location (Human)
Chr.	Chromosome 5 (human)
Band	5q31.2	Start	139,387,467 bp
Band	5q31.2	End	139,390,081 bp

Gene location (Mouse)
Chr.	Chromosome 18 (mouse)
Band	18|18 B2	Start	35,780,320 bp
Band	18|18 B2	End	35,782,420 bp
RNA expression pattern
Bgee	Human / Mouse (ortholog); Top expressed in: thymus; spleen; lymph node; appendix; rectum; mucosa of transverse colon; tonsil; bone marrow cells; trachea; duodenum / Top expressed in: spleen; ileum; jejunum; bone marrow; colon; thymus; duodenum; granulocyte; embryo; pharynx; More reference expression data
BioGPS	n/a
Gene ontology
Molecular function	protein binding
Cellular component	cytoplasm; extracellular region; endoplasmic reticulum lumen; endoplasmic reticulum; endoplasmic reticulum chaperone complex
Biological process	integrin activation; regulation of cell population proliferation; positive regulation of cell population proliferation; apoptotic process; regulation of B cell proliferation; regulation of insulin receptor signaling pathway
Sources:Amigo / QuickGO
Orthologs
Species	Human	Mouse
Entrez	51237	69816
Ensembl	ENSG00000170476	ENSMUSG00000024353
UniProt	Q8WU39	Q9D8I1
RefSeq (mRNA)	NM_016459	NM_027222
RefSeq (protein)	NP_057543	NP_081498
Location (UCSC)	Chr 5: 139.39 – 139.39 Mb	Chr 18: 35.78 – 35.78 Mb
PubMed search
- Wikidata
View/Edit Human	View/Edit Mouse

Marginal zone B and B1 cell-specific protein is a protein that in humans is encoded by the MZB1 gene.
