= HMGXB3 =

Protein-coding gene in the species Homo sapiens

Identifiers
- Aliases: HMGXB3, HMGX3, SMF, HMG-box containing 3
- External IDs: MGI: 2441817; GeneCards: HMGXB3

Gene location (Human)
Chr.	Chromosome 5 (human)
Band	5q32	Start	150,000,046 bp
Band	5q32	End	150,053,142 bp

Gene location (Mouse)
Chr.	Chromosome 18 (mouse)
Band	18|18 E1	Start	61,264,349 bp
Band	18|18 E1	End	61,310,122 bp
RNA expression pattern
Bgee	Human / Mouse (ortholog); Top expressed in: olfactory bulb; stromal cell of endometrium; right uterine tube; vena cava; parotid gland; cardia; nasal epithelium; lateral nuclear group of thalamus; pylorus; trachea / Top expressed in: Rostral migratory stream; spermatocyte; zygote; spermatid; tail of embryo; secondary oocyte; substantia nigra; retinal pigment epithelium; female urethra; motor neuron; More reference expression data
BioGPS	n/a
Gene ontology
Molecular function	DNA binding; kinase activity; DNA-binding transcription factor activity, RNA polymerase II-specific
Cellular component	nucleus; cellular component
Biological process	phosphorylation; biological process; regulation of transcription by RNA polymerase II
Sources:Amigo / QuickGO
Orthologs
Databases	NCBI: entry; OMA: entry
Species	Human	Mouse
Entrez	22993	106894
Ensembl	ENSG00000113716	ENSMUSG00000024622
UniProt	Q12766; Q562E5	n/a
RefSeq (mRNA)	NM_014983; NM_001366501	NM_134134; NM_178277
RefSeq (protein)	NP_055798; NP_001353430; NP_055798.2	n/a
Location (UCSC)	Chr 5: 150 – 150.05 Mb	Chr 18: 61.26 – 61.31 Mb
PubMed search
- Wikidata
View/Edit Human	View/Edit Mouse

HMG-box containing 3 is a protein that in humans is encoded by the HMGXB3 gene.

== Function ==
This gene is one of the non-canonical high mobility group (HMG) genes. The encoded protein contains an HMG-box domain found in DNA binding proteins such as transcription factors and chromosomal proteins.
