= PPIP5K2 =

Protein-coding gene in the species Homo sapiens

Identifiers
- Aliases: PPIP5K2, HISPPD1, IP7K2, VIP2, CFAP160, diphosphoinositol pentakisphosphate kinase 2, DFNB100
- External IDs: OMIM: 611648; MGI: 2142810; GeneCards: PPIP5K2
Available structures
| PDB | Ortholog search: PDBe RCSB |
| PDB | List of PDB id codes 3T54, 3T7A, 3T99, 3T9A, 3T9B, 3T9C, 3T9D, 3T9E, 3T9F, 4HN2, 4NZM, 4NZN, 4NZO, 4Q4C, 4Q4D, 5BYA, 5BYB |
Enzyme activity
| EC # | BRENDA | ExPASy | KEGG | MetaCyc |
|---|---|---|---|---|
| 2.7.4.24 | ↗ | ↗ | ↗ | ↗ |

Gene location (Human)
| Chr. | Chromosome 5 (human) |
| Band | 5q21.1 | Start | 103,120,149 bp |
| Band | 5q21.1 | End | 103,212,799 bp |

Gene location (Mouse)
| Chr. | Chromosome 1 (mouse) |
| Band | 1|1 D | Start | 97,706,048 bp |
| Band | 1|1 D | End | 97,770,411 bp |
RNA expression pattern
| Bgee | Human / Mouse (ortholog); Top expressed in: Achilles tendon; ganglionic eminence; sural nerve; bone marrow cell; tibia; monocyte; rectum; ventricular zone; Descending thoracic aorta; left ovary / Top expressed in: hand; superior cervical ganglion; interventricular septum; epithelium of small intestine; secondary oocyte; zygote; myocardium of ventricle; tail of embryo; genital tubercle; migratory enteric neural crest cell; More reference expression data |
| BioGPS | n/a |
Gene ontology
| Molecular function | inositol hexakisphosphate 5-kinase activity; transferase activity; inositol hexakisphosphate 1-kinase activity; nucleotide binding; diphosphoinositol-pentakisphosphate kinase activity; inositol-1,3,4,5,6-pentakisphosphate kinase activity; inositol hexakisphosphate 3-kinase activity; kinase activity; inositol hexakisphosphate kinase activity; ATP binding; inositol heptakisphosphate kinase activity; 5-diphosphoinositol pentakisphosphate 3-kinase activity |
| Cellular component | cytoplasm; cytosol |
| Biological process | inositol phosphate metabolic process; phosphorylation; inositol phosphate biosynthetic process; inositol metabolic process |
Sources:Amigo / QuickGO
Orthologs
| Databases | NCBI: entry; OMA: entry |
| Species | Human | Mouse |
| Entrez | 23262 | 227399 |
| Ensembl | ENSG00000145725 | ENSMUSG00000040648 |
| UniProt | O43314 | Q6ZQB6 |
| RefSeq (mRNA) | NM_001276277; NM_001281471; NM_015216; NM_001345871; NM_001345872 NM_001345873; NM_001345874; NM_001345875; NM_001345876; NM_001345877; NM_001345878 | NM_173760 |
| RefSeq (protein) | NP_001263206; NP_001268400; NP_001332800; NP_001332801; NP_001332802 NP_001332803; NP_001332804; NP_001332805; NP_001332806; NP_001332807; NP_056031 | NP_776121; NP_001392387; NP_001392388; NP_001392389; NP_001392390 NP_001392391; NP_001392392; NP_001392393; NP_001392394; NP_001392395; NP_001392396; NP_001392397; NP_001392398; NP_001392399; NP_001392400; NP_001392401; NP_001392402 |
| Location (UCSC) | Chr 5: 103.12 – 103.21 Mb | Chr 1: 97.71 – 97.77 Mb |
| PubMed search |
- Wikidata
| View/Edit Human | View/Edit Mouse |

Diphosphoinositol pentakisphosphate kinase 2 is a protein that in humans is encoded by the PPIP5K2 gene.

== Function ==
Inositol phosphates (IPs) and diphosphoinositol phosphates (PP-IPs), also known as inositol pyrophosphates, act as cell signaling molecules.

HISPPD1 has both IP6 kinase (EC 2.7.4.21) and PP-IP5 (also called IP7) kinase (EC 2.7.4.24) activities that produce the high-energy pyrophosphates PP-IP5 and PP2-IP4 (also called IP8), respectively (Fridy et al., 2007 [PubMed 17690096]).
