= CREBRF =

Protein-coding gene in the species Homo sapiens

Identifiers
- Aliases: CREBRF, C5orf41, LRF, CREB3 regulatory factor
- External IDs: OMIM: 617109; MGI: 1924378; GeneCards: CREBRF

Gene location (Human)
Chr.	Chromosome 5 (human)
Band	5q35.1	Start	173,056,352 bp
Band	5q35.1	End	173,139,284 bp

Gene location (Mouse)
Chr.	Chromosome 17 (mouse)
Band	17|17 A3.3	Start	26,715,650 bp
Band	17|17 A3.3	End	26,776,635 bp
RNA expression pattern
Bgee	Human / Mouse (ortholog); Top expressed in: Achilles tendon; superficial temporal artery; synovial membrane; internal globus pallidus; lower lobe of lung; urethra; bone marrow cell; cardiac muscle tissue of right atrium; caput epididymis; tail of epididymis / Top expressed in: vestibular membrane of cochlear duct; ciliary body; spermatocyte; dorsomedial hypothalamic nucleus; iris; carotid body; spermatid; retinal pigment epithelium; Epithelium of choroid plexus; suprachiasmatic nucleus; More reference expression data
BioGPS	n/a
Gene ontology
Molecular function	DNA-binding transcription factor activity; protein binding; RNA polymerase II transcription regulatory region sequence-specific DNA binding; DNA-binding transcription activator activity, RNA polymerase II-specific; DNA-binding transcription factor activity, RNA polymerase II-specific
Cellular component	cytoplasm; nuclear body; nucleus; nucleoplasm
Biological process	negative regulation of endoplasmic reticulum unfolded protein response; positive regulation of prolactin signaling pathway; response to unfolded protein; regulation of transcription, DNA-templated; negative regulation of transcription by RNA polymerase II; positive regulation of protein catabolic process; maternal behavior; negative regulation of glucocorticoid mediated signaling pathway; positive regulation of intracellular transport; transcription, DNA-templated; response to endoplasmic reticulum stress; positive regulation of protein transport; endoplasmic reticulum unfolded protein response; transcription by RNA polymerase II; positive regulation of transcription by RNA polymerase II
Sources:Amigo / QuickGO
Orthologs
Databases	NCBI: entry; OMA: entry
Species	Human	Mouse
Entrez	153222	77128
Ensembl	ENSG00000164463	ENSMUSG00000048249
UniProt	Q8IUR6	Q8CDG5
RefSeq (mRNA)	NM_001168393; NM_001168394; NM_153607	NM_029870
RefSeq (protein)	NP_001161865; NP_001161866; NP_705835	NP_084146
Location (UCSC)	Chr 5: 173.06 – 173.14 Mb	Chr 17: 26.72 – 26.78 Mb
PubMed search
- Wikidata
View/Edit Human	View/Edit Mouse

CREB3 regulatory factor is a protein that in humans is encoded by the CREBRF gene.
