= Zinc finger protein 608 =

Protein found in humans

ZNF608

Identifiers
- Aliases: ZNF608, NY-REN-36, zinc finger protein 608
- External IDs: MGI: 2442338; GeneCards: ZNF608

Gene location (Human)
Chr.	Chromosome 5 (human)
Band	5q23.2	Start	124,636,913 bp
Band	5q23.2	End	124,748,807 bp

Gene location (Mouse)
Chr.	Chromosome 18 (mouse)
Band	18|18 D3	Start	55,021,120 bp
Band	18|18 D3	End	55,125,627 bp
RNA expression pattern
Bgee	Human / Mouse (ortholog); Top expressed in: cardiac muscle tissue of right atrium; ganglionic eminence; ventricular zone; corpus callosum; sural nerve; C1 segment; cerebellar vermis; right adrenal cortex; left adrenal cortex; gastric mucosa / Top expressed in: Rostral migratory stream; hand; otolith organ; utricle; granulocyte; tail of embryo; genital tubercle; ganglionic eminence; left lung lobe; foot; More reference expression data
BioGPS	n/a
Orthologs
Databases	NCBI: entry; OMA: entry
Species	Human	Mouse
Entrez	57507	269023
Ensembl	ENSG00000168916	ENSMUSG00000052713
UniProt	Q9ULD9	Q56A10
RefSeq (mRNA)	NM_020747; NM_001385619; NM_001385620; NM_001385621	NM_175751; NM_001360787
RefSeq (protein)	NP_065798	NP_786927; NP_001347716
Location (UCSC)	Chr 5: 124.64 – 124.75 Mb	Chr 18: 55.02 – 55.13 Mb
PubMed search
- Wikidata
View/Edit Human	View/Edit Mouse

Zinc finger protein 608 is a protein that in humans is encoded by the ZNF608 gene.
