= NUDCD2 =

Protein-coding gene in the species Homo sapiens

Available structures
| PDB | Ortholog search: PDBe RCSB |
| PDB | List of PDB id codes 2RH0 |

Identifiers
- Aliases: NUDCD2, NudCL2, NudC domain containing 2
- External IDs: MGI: 1277103; HomoloGene: 12094; GeneCards: NUDCD2; OMA:NUDCD2 - orthologs

Gene location (Human)
| Chr. | Chromosome 5 (human) |
| Band | 5q34 | Start | 163,446,526 bp |
| Band | 5q34 | End | 163,460,102 bp |

Gene location (Mouse)
| Chr. | Chromosome 11 (mouse) |
| Band | 11 A5|11 24.41 cM | Start | 40,624,494 bp |
| Band | 11 A5|11 24.41 cM | End | 40,630,873 bp |
RNA expression pattern
| Bgee | Human / Mouse (ortholog); Top expressed in: oocyte; ventricular zone; secondary oocyte; ganglionic eminence; C1 segment; skin of arm; Brodmann area 46; corpus epididymis; parotid gland; human penis / Top expressed in: abdominal wall; primitive streak; ureter; mandibular prominence; medial ganglionic eminence; cumulus cell; maxillary prominence; migratory enteric neural crest cell; human fetus; dermis; More reference expression data |
| BioGPS | n/a |
Gene ontology
| Molecular function | protein binding; unfolded protein binding |
| Cellular component | spindle pole; intracellular anatomical structure; chromosome, centromeric region; cytoskeleton; kinetochore; chromosome; microtubule organizing center; cytoplasm |
| Biological process | protein folding; developmental process |
Sources:Amigo / QuickGO
Orthologs
| Species | Human | Mouse |
| Entrez | 134492 | 52653 |
| Ensembl | ENSG00000170584 | ENSMUSG00000020328 |
| UniProt | Q8WVJ2 | Q9CQ48 |
| RefSeq (mRNA) | NM_001329991; NM_145266 | NM_001290697; NM_026023 |
| RefSeq (protein) | NP_001316920; NP_660309 | NP_001277626; NP_080299 |
| Location (UCSC) | Chr 5: 163.45 – 163.46 Mb | Chr 11: 40.62 – 40.63 Mb |
| PubMed search |
- Wikidata
| View/Edit Human | View/Edit Mouse |

NudC domain-containing protein 2 is a protein that in humans is encoded by the NUDCD2 gene.
