= Fas associated factor family member 2 =

Protein-coding gene in the species Homo sapiens

FAF2

Identifiers
- Aliases: FAF2, ETEA, UBXD8, UBXN3B, Fas associated factor family member 2
- External IDs: OMIM: 616935; MGI: 1923827; GeneCards: FAF2
Available structures
| PDB | Ortholog search: PDBe RCSB |
| PDB | List of PDB id codes 2DAM |

Gene location (Human)
| Chr. | Chromosome 5 (human) |
| Band | 5q35.2 | Start | 176,447,628 bp |
| Band | 5q35.2 | End | 176,510,074 bp |

Gene location (Mouse)
| Chr. | Chromosome 13 (mouse) |
| Band | 13|13 B1 | Start | 54,769,597 bp |
| Band | 13|13 B1 | End | 54,811,876 bp |
RNA expression pattern
| Bgee | Human / Mouse (ortholog); Top expressed in: parotid gland; gingival epithelium; tibia; caput epididymis; corpus epididymis; tail of epididymis; parietal pleura; visceral pleura; inferior olivary nucleus; islet of Langerhans / Top expressed in: spermatocyte; spermatid; yolk sac; right kidney; otolith organ; interventricular septum; utricle; tail of embryo; neural tube; genital tubercle; More reference expression data |
| BioGPS | n/a |
Gene ontology
| Molecular function | lipase inhibitor activity; ubiquitin binding; protein binding; lipase binding; ubiquitin protein ligase binding |
| Cellular component | VCP-NPL4-UFD1 AAA ATPase complex; cytoplasm; lipid droplet; endoplasmic reticulum; extracellular region; azurophil granule lumen |
| Biological process | response to unfolded protein; retrograde protein transport, ER to cytosol; ubiquitin-dependent ERAD pathway; lipid droplet organization; negative regulation of catalytic activity; neutrophil degranulation; proteasome-mediated ubiquitin-dependent protein catabolic process |
Sources:Amigo / QuickGO
Orthologs
| Databases | NCBI: entry; OMA: entry |
| Species | Human | Mouse |
| Entrez | 23197 | 76577 |
| Ensembl | ENSG00000113194 | ENSMUSG00000025873 |
| UniProt | Q96CS3 | Q3TDN2 |
| RefSeq (mRNA) | NM_014613 | NM_178397 |
| RefSeq (protein) | NP_055428 | NP_848484 |
| Location (UCSC) | Chr 5: 176.45 – 176.51 Mb | Chr 13: 54.77 – 54.81 Mb |
| PubMed search |
- Wikidata
| View/Edit Human | View/Edit Mouse |

Fas associated factor family member 2 is a protein that in humans is encoded by the FAF2 gene.

== Function ==
The protein encoded by this gene is highly expressed in peripheral blood of patients with atopic dermatitis (AD), compared to normal individuals. It may play a role in regulating the resistance to apoptosis that is observed in T cells and eosinophils of AD patients. [provided by RefSeq, Jul 2008].
