= NSA2 =

Protein-coding gene in the species Homo sapiens

Identifiers
- Aliases: NSA2, CDK105, HCL-G1, HCLG1, HUSSY29, TINP1, HUSSY-29, ribosome biogenesis homolog, NSA2 ribosome biogenesis factor
- External IDs: OMIM: 612497; MGI: 1913883; GeneCards: NSA2

Gene location (Human)
| Chr. | Chromosome 5 (human) |
| Band | 5q13.3 | Start | 74,766,991 bp |
| Band | 5q13.3 | End | 74,780,113 bp |

Gene location (Mouse)
| Chr. | Chromosome 13 (mouse) |
| Band | 13|13 D1 | Start | 97,265,932 bp |
| Band | 13|13 D1 | End | 97,274,445 bp |
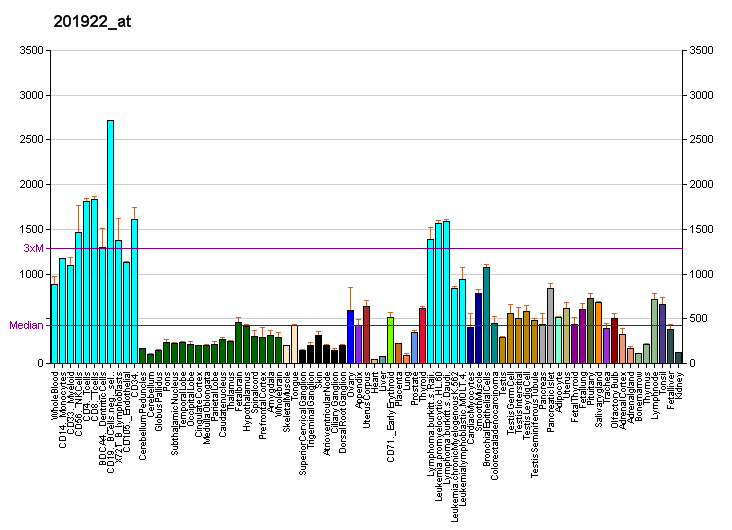
RNA expression pattern
| Bgee | Human / Mouse (ortholog); Top expressed in: Achilles tendon; parotid gland; skin of thigh; skin of hip; hair follicle; glutes; germinal epithelium; parietal pleura; tail of epididymis; left ovary / Top expressed in: genital tubercle; tail of embryo; ventricular zone; esophagus; yolk sac; embryo; embryo; muscle of thigh; lip; morula; More reference expression data |
| BioGPS | More reference expression data |
Gene ontology
| Molecular function | RNA binding |
| Cellular component | preribosome, large subunit precursor; nucleus; nucleolus |
| Biological process | rRNA processing; ribosome biogenesis; maturation of LSU-rRNA; maturation of 5.8S rRNA |
Sources:Amigo / QuickGO
Orthologs
| Databases | NCBI: entry; OMA: entry |
| Species | Human | Mouse |
| Entrez | 10412 | 59050 |
| Ensembl | ENSG00000164346 | ENSMUSG00000060739 |
| UniProt | O95478 | Q9CR47 |
| RefSeq (mRNA) | NM_001271665; NM_014886; NM_001364506 | NM_021552 |
| RefSeq (protein) | NP_001258594; NP_055701; NP_001351435 | NP_067527 |
| Location (UCSC) | Chr 5: 74.77 – 74.78 Mb | Chr 13: 97.27 – 97.27 Mb |
| PubMed search |
- Wikidata
| View/Edit Human | View/Edit Mouse |

Ribosome biogenesis factor NSA2 homolog is a protein that in humans is encoded by the NSA2 gene (previously TINP1). This protein is involved in the production of the 60S ribosomal subunit.
