= MGAT1 =

Protein-coding gene in the species Homo sapiens

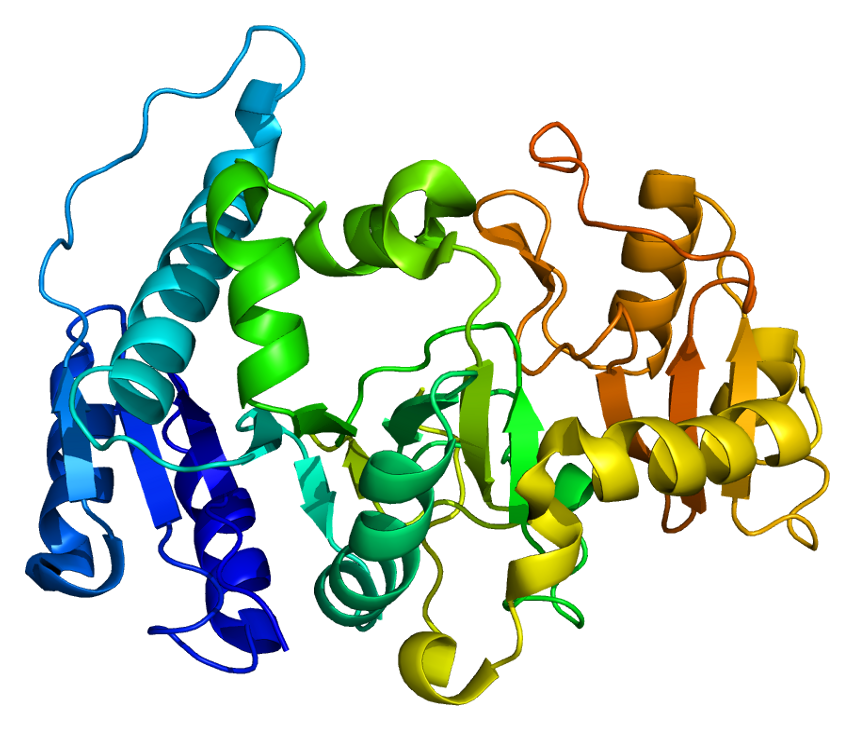

Identifiers
- Aliases: MGAT1, GLCNAC-TI, GLCT1, GLYT1, GNT-1, GNT-I, MGAT, GnTI, mannosyl (alpha-1,3-)-glycoprotein beta-1,2-N-acetylglucosaminyltransferase
- External IDs: OMIM: 160995; MGI: 96973; GeneCards: MGAT1
Enzyme activity
EC #	BRENDA	ExPASy	KEGG	MetaCyc
2.4.1.101	↗	↗	↗	↗

Gene location (Human)
Chr.	Chromosome 5 (human)
Band	5q35.3	Start	180,784,782 bp
Band	5q35.3	End	180,815,652 bp

Gene location (Mouse)
Chr.	Chromosome 11 (mouse)
Band	11 B1.2|11 29.27 cM	Start	49,135,018 bp
Band	11 B1.2|11 29.27 cM	End	49,153,857 bp
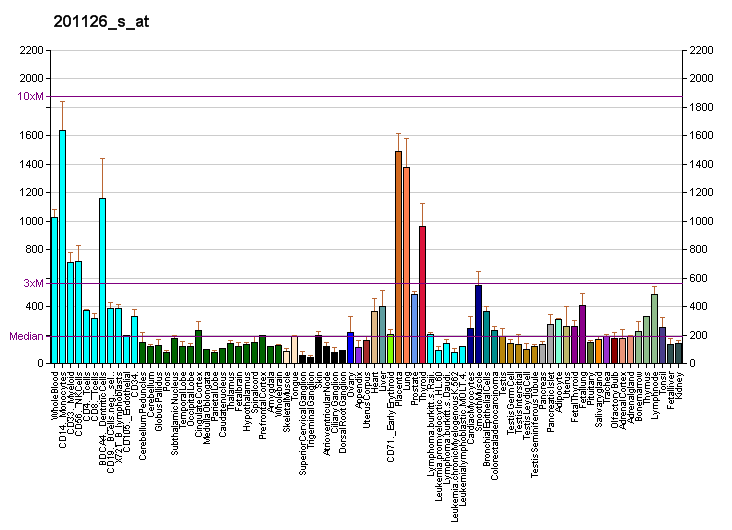
RNA expression pattern
Bgee	Human / Mouse (ortholog); Top expressed in: monocyte; granulocyte; right lung; gastric mucosa; upper lobe of left lung; apex of heart; right lobe of thyroid gland; left uterine tube; spleen; left lobe of thyroid gland / Top expressed in: neural layer of retina; granulocyte; thymus; yolk sac; right kidney; choroid plexus of fourth ventricle; proximal tubule; tibiofemoral joint; molar; lip; More reference expression data
BioGPS	More reference expression data
Gene ontology
Molecular function	glycosyltransferase activity; transferase activity; acetylglucosaminyltransferase activity; metal ion binding; alpha-1,3-mannosylglycoprotein 2-beta-N-acetylglucosaminyltransferase activity; manganese ion binding
Cellular component	integral component of membrane; extracellular vesicle; Golgi membrane; Golgi apparatus; extracellular exosome; membrane
Biological process	protein glycosylation; in utero embryonic development; UDP-N-acetylglucosamine catabolic process; carbohydrate metabolic process; protein N-linked glycosylation; protein N-linked glycosylation via asparagine
Sources:Amigo / QuickGO
Orthologs
Databases	NCBI: entry; OMA: entry
Species	Human	Mouse
Entrez	4245	17308
Ensembl	ENSG00000131446	ENSMUSG00000020346
UniProt	P26572	P27808
RefSeq (mRNA)	NM_001114617; NM_001114618; NM_001114619; NM_001114620; NM_002406	NM_001110148; NM_001110149; NM_001110150; NM_010794
RefSeq (protein)	NP_001108089; NP_001108090; NP_001108091; NP_001108092; NP_002397 NP_001351306; NP_001351308; NP_001351309; NP_001351310; NP_001351311; NP_001351312; NP_001351313; NP_001351314; NP_001351315; NP_001351316; NP_001351317; NP_001351318; NP_001351319; NP_001351320; NP_001351321; NP_001351322; NP_001351323; NP_001351324	NP_001103618; NP_001103619; NP_001103620; NP_034924
Location (UCSC)	Chr 5: 180.78 – 180.82 Mb	Chr 11: 49.14 – 49.15 Mb
PubMed search
- Wikidata
View/Edit Human	View/Edit Mouse

Alpha-1,3-mannosyl-glycoprotein 2-beta-N-acetylglucosaminyltransferase is an enzyme that in humans is encoded by the MGAT1 gene.

There are over 100 different glycosyltransferases involved in the synthesis of protein-bound and lipid-bound oligosaccharides. UDP-N-acetylglucosamine:alpha-3-D-mannoside beta-1,2-N-acetylglucosaminyltransferase I is a medial-Golgi enzyme essential for the synthesis of hybrid and complex N-glycans. The protein, encoded by a single exon, shows typical features of a type II transmembrane protein. The protein is believed to be essential for normal embryogenesis.
