= FCHSD1 =

Protein-coding gene in the species Homo sapiens

Identifiers
- Aliases: FCHSD1, NWK2, FCH and double SH3 domains 1
- External IDs: OMIM: 617555; MGI: 2441771; GeneCards: FCHSD1

Gene location (Human)
Chr.	Chromosome 5 (human)
Band	5q31.3	Start	141,639,302 bp
Band	5q31.3	End	141,651,418 bp

Gene location (Mouse)
Chr.	Chromosome 18 (mouse)
Band	18|18 B3	Start	38,090,484 bp
Band	18|18 B3	End	38,102,827 bp
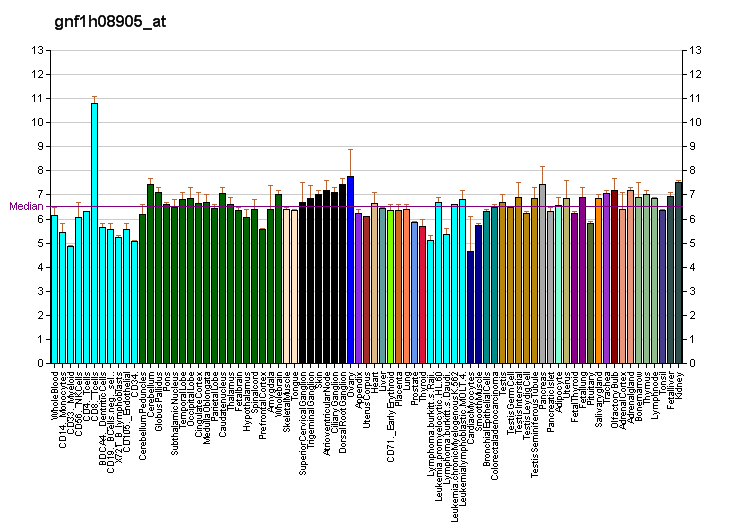
RNA expression pattern
Bgee	Human / Mouse (ortholog); Top expressed in: granulocyte; left ovary; Descending thoracic aorta; appendix; right ovary; anterior pituitary; ascending aorta; sural nerve; body of uterus; ectocervix / Top expressed in: granulocyte; lip; ventricular zone; right kidney; blood; dentate gyrus of hippocampal formation granule cell; embryo; esophagus; neural layer of retina; primary visual cortex; More reference expression data
BioGPS	More reference expression data
Gene ontology
Molecular function	lipid binding
Cellular component	neuromuscular junction; recycling endosome; cuticular plate; cytoplasm; cytoplasmic vesicle; cell projection; perikaryon
Biological process	neuromuscular synaptic transmission; regulation of actin filament polymerization; positive regulation of actin filament polymerization
Sources:Amigo / QuickGO
Orthologs
Databases	NCBI: entry; OMA: entry
Species	Human	Mouse
Entrez	89848	319262
Ensembl	ENSG00000197948	ENSMUSG00000038524
UniProt	Q86WN1	Q6PFY1
RefSeq (mRNA)	NM_033449	NM_175684
RefSeq (protein)	NP_258260	NP_783615
Location (UCSC)	Chr 5: 141.64 – 141.65 Mb	Chr 18: 38.09 – 38.1 Mb
PubMed search
- Wikidata
View/Edit Human	View/Edit Mouse

FCH and double SH3 domains protein 1 is a protein that in humans is encoded by the FCHSD1 gene.
