= PCBD2 =

Protein-coding gene in the species Homo sapiens

Identifiers
- Aliases: PCBD2, DCOH2, DCOHM, PHS2, pterin-4 alpha-carbinolamine dehydratase 2
- External IDs: OMIM: 609836; MGI: 1919812; GeneCards: PCBD2
Available structures
PDB	Ortholog search: PDBe RCSB
PDB	List of PDB id codes 4C45
Enzyme activity
EC #	BRENDA	ExPASy	KEGG	MetaCyc
4.2.1.96	↗	↗	↗	↗

Gene location (Human)
Chr.	Chromosome 5 (human)
Band	5q31.1	Start	134,905,120 bp
Band	5q31.1	End	135,007,959 bp

Gene location (Mouse)
Chr.	Chromosome 13 (mouse)
Band	13|13 B1	Start	55,875,181 bp
Band	13|13 B1	End	55,924,643 bp
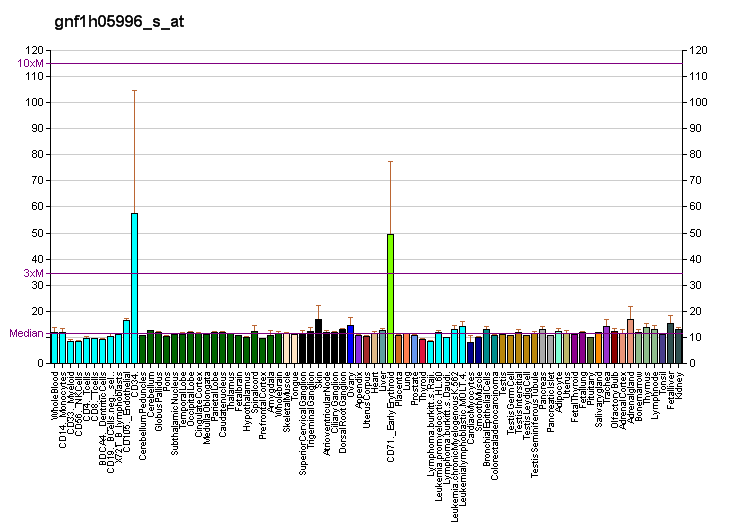
RNA expression pattern
Bgee	Human / Mouse (ortholog); Top expressed in: tibialis anterior muscle; deltoid muscle; vastus lateralis muscle; gastrocnemius muscle; muscle of thigh; biceps brachii; Skeletal muscle tissue of biceps brachii; endothelial cell; Skeletal muscle tissue of rectus abdominis; left ventricle / Top expressed in: renal corpuscle; medullary collecting duct; primary oocyte; Epithelium of choroid plexus; facial motor nucleus; vestibular membrane of cochlear duct; proximal tubule; right kidney; yolk sac; Ileal epithelium; More reference expression data
BioGPS	More reference expression data
Gene ontology
Molecular function	protein binding; 4-alpha-hydroxytetrahydrobiopterin dehydratase activity; phenylalanine 4-monooxygenase activity; lyase activity
Cellular component	nucleus; cellular component
Biological process	tetrahydrobiopterin biosynthetic process; positive regulation of transcription, DNA-templated; protein homotetramerization; protein heterooligomerization
Sources:Amigo / QuickGO
Orthologs
Databases	NCBI: entry; OMA: entry
Species	Human	Mouse
Entrez	84105	72562
Ensembl	ENSG00000132570	ENSMUSG00000021496
UniProt	Q9H0N5	Q9CZL5
RefSeq (mRNA)	NM_032151	NM_028281
RefSeq (protein)	NP_115527	NP_082557
Location (UCSC)	Chr 5: 134.91 – 135.01 Mb	Chr 13: 55.88 – 55.92 Mb
PubMed search
- Wikidata
View/Edit Human	View/Edit Mouse

Pterin-4-alpha-carbinolamine dehydratase 2 is an enzyme that in humans is encoded by the PCBD2 gene.
