= C1QTNF3 =

Protein-coding gene in the species Homo sapiens

Identifiers
- Aliases: C1QTNF3, C1ATNF3, CORCS, CORS, CORS-26, CORS26, CTRP3, C1q and tumor necrosis factor related protein 3, C1q and TNF related 3
- External IDs: OMIM: 612045; MGI: 1932136; GeneCards: C1QTNF3

Gene location (Human)
Chr.	Chromosome 5 (human)
Band	5p13.2	Start	34,017,858 bp
Band	5p13.2	End	34,043,213 bp

Gene location (Mouse)
Chr.	Chromosome 15 (mouse)
Band	15 A1|15	Start	10,952,418 bp
Band	15 A1|15	End	10,980,236 bp
RNA expression pattern
Bgee	Human / Mouse (ortholog); Top expressed in: parotid gland; Achilles tendon; cartilage tissue; vena cava; cardia; right testis; left testis; skin of hip; synovial joint; epithelium of colon / Top expressed in: right kidney; dermis; human fetus; muscle of thorax; proximal tubule; body of femur; human kidney; cervix; condyle; umbilical cord; More reference expression data
BioGPS	n/a
Gene ontology
Molecular function	protein binding; molecular function
Cellular component	extracellular region; collagen; extracellular exosome; membrane; extracellular space
Biological process	cellular triglyceride homeostasis; negative regulation of monocyte chemotactic protein-1 production; negative regulation of gluconeogenesis; protein trimerization; fat cell differentiation; negative regulation of inflammatory response; negative regulation of gene expression; positive regulation of adiponectin secretion; negative regulation of NIK/NF-kappaB signaling
Sources:Amigo / QuickGO
Orthologs
Databases	NCBI: entry; OMA: entry
Species	Human	Mouse
Entrez	114899	81799
Ensembl	ENSG00000082196	ENSMUSG00000058914
UniProt	Q9BXJ4	Q9ES30
RefSeq (mRNA)	NM_181435; NM_030945	NM_001204134; NM_030888
RefSeq (protein)	NP_112207; NP_852100	NP_001191063; NP_112150
Location (UCSC)	Chr 5: 34.02 – 34.04 Mb	Chr 15: 10.95 – 10.98 Mb
PubMed search
- Wikidata
View/Edit Human	View/Edit Mouse

Complement C1q tumor necrosis factor-related protein 3 is a protein that in humans is encoded by the C1QTNF3 gene.
