= Testis specific serine kinase 1B =

Protein-coding gene in the species Homo sapiens

TSSK1B

Identifiers
- Aliases: TSSK1B, SPOGA4, STK22D, TSK1, TSSK1, FKSG81, testis specific serine kinase 1B
- External IDs: OMIM: 610709; MGI: 1347557; HomoloGene: 56448; GeneCards: TSSK1B; OMA:TSSK1B - orthologs

Gene location (Human)
Chr.	Chromosome 5 (human)
Band	5q22.2	Start	113,432,553 bp
Band	5q22.2	End	113,434,989 bp

Gene location (Mouse)
Chr.	Chromosome 16 (mouse)
Band	16 A3|16 11.09 cM	Start	17,712,087 bp
Band	16 A3|16 11.09 cM	End	17,715,786 bp
RNA expression pattern
Bgee	Human / Mouse (ortholog); Top expressed in: right testis; left testis; testicle; olfactory zone of nasal mucosa; right coronary artery; prefrontal cortex; human musculoskeletal system; muscular system; muscle; muscle / Top expressed in: seminiferous tubule; spermatid; fetal liver hematopoietic progenitor cell; spermatocyte; morula; gastrula; vestibular membrane of cochlear duct; pancreas; adrenal gland; islet of Langerhans; More reference expression data
BioGPS	n/a
Gene ontology
Molecular function	transferase activity; nucleotide binding; protein kinase activity; protein serine/threonine kinase activity; protein binding; ATP binding; magnesium ion binding; metal ion binding; kinase activity; protein-containing complex binding
Cellular component	cytoplasm; cell projection; acrosomal vesicle; motile cilium; cytoplasmic vesicle; nucleus; cilium
Biological process	multicellular organism development; protein phosphorylation; cell differentiation; intracellular signal transduction; spermatogenesis; phosphorylation; spermatid development; peptidyl-serine phosphorylation
Sources:Amigo / QuickGO
Orthologs
Species	Human	Mouse
Entrez	83942	22114
Ensembl	ENSG00000212122	ENSMUSG00000041566
UniProt	Q9BXA7	Q61241
RefSeq (mRNA)	NM_032028	NM_009435
RefSeq (protein)	NP_114417	NP_033461
Location (UCSC)	Chr 5: 113.43 – 113.43 Mb	Chr 16: 17.71 – 17.72 Mb
PubMed search
- Wikidata
View/Edit Human	View/Edit Mouse

Testis specific serine kinase 1B is a protein that in humans is encoded by the TSSK1B gene.

== Function ==
TSSK1 belongs to a family of serine/threonine kinases highly expressed in testis (Hao et al., 2004 [PubMed 15044604]).[supplied by OMIM, Mar 2008].
