= MEF2C antisense RNA 1 =

Non-coding RNA in humans

MEF2C-AS1

Identifiers
- Aliases: MEF2C-AS1, CTC-454M9.1, MEF2C antisense RNA 1
- External IDs: GeneCards: MEF2C-AS1

Gene location (Human)
Chr.	Chromosome 5 (human)
Band	5q14.3	Start	88,883,328 bp
Band	5q14.3	End	89,466,398 bp
RNA expression pattern
Bgee	Human / Mouse (ortholog); Top expressed in: Achilles tendon; left ovary; testicle; right ovary; muscle of thigh; body of uterus; gastrocnemius muscle; popliteal artery; tibial arteries; epithelium of colon / n/a; More reference expression data
BioGPS	n/a
Orthologs
Databases	NCBI: entry; OMA: entry
Species	Human	Mouse
Entrez	101929423	n/a
Ensembl	ENSG00000248309	n/a
UniProt	n a	n/a
RefSeq (mRNA)	n/a	n/a
RefSeq (protein)	n/a	n/a
Location (UCSC)	Chr 5: 88.88 – 89.47 Mb	n/a
PubMed search		n/a
- Wikidata
View/Edit Human

MEF2C antisense RNA 1 is a non-coding RNA that in humans is encoded by the MEF2C-AS1 gene.
