= LMAN2 =

Protein-coding gene in the species Homo sapiens

Identifiers
- Aliases: LMAN2, C5orf8, GP36B, VIP36, lectin, mannose binding 2
- External IDs: OMIM: 609551; MGI: 1914140; HomoloGene: 4962; GeneCards: LMAN2; OMA:LMAN2 - orthologs

Gene location (Human)
Chr.	Chromosome 5 (human)
Band	5q35.3	Start	177,315,805 bp
Band	5q35.3	End	177,351,840 bp

Gene location (Mouse)
Chr.	Chromosome 13 (mouse)
Band	13|13 B1	Start	55,491,646 bp
Band	13|13 B1	End	55,510,596 bp
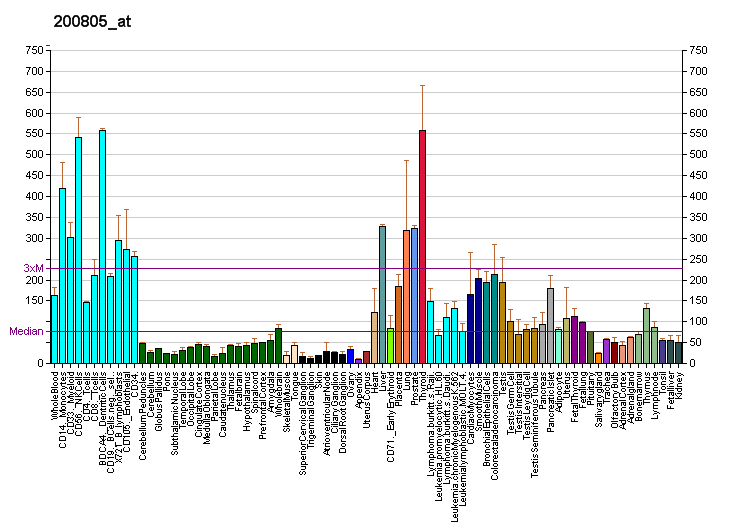
RNA expression pattern
Bgee	Human / Mouse (ortholog); Top expressed in: stromal cell of endometrium; body of pancreas; right lobe of liver; mucosa of esophagus; granulocyte; gallbladder; mucosa of transverse colon; right lobe of thyroid gland; monocyte; left lobe of thyroid gland / Top expressed in: spermatid; right kidney; spermatocyte; decidua; yolk sac; proximal tubule; brown adipose tissue; lacrimal gland; islet of Langerhans; lip; More reference expression data
BioGPS	More reference expression data
Gene ontology
Molecular function	mannose binding; heat shock protein binding; metal ion binding; carbohydrate binding; protein binding
Cellular component	integral component of membrane; cell surface; Golgi apparatus; integral component of plasma membrane; extracellular exosome; endoplasmic reticulum-Golgi intermediate compartment membrane; endoplasmic reticulum; membrane; endoplasmic reticulum-Golgi intermediate compartment; extracellular space; Golgi membrane; endoplasmic reticulum membrane; COPII-coated ER to Golgi transport vesicle
Biological process	protein transport; positive regulation of phagocytosis; retrograde vesicle-mediated transport, Golgi to endoplasmic reticulum; transport; endoplasmic reticulum to Golgi vesicle-mediated transport; endoplasmic reticulum organization; Golgi organization
Sources:Amigo / QuickGO
Orthologs
Species	Human	Mouse
Entrez	10960	66890
Ensembl	ENSG00000169223	ENSMUSG00000021484
UniProt	Q12907	Q9DBH5
RefSeq (mRNA)	NM_006816	NM_025828
RefSeq (protein)	NP_006807	NP_080104
Location (UCSC)	Chr 5: 177.32 – 177.35 Mb	Chr 13: 55.49 – 55.51 Mb
PubMed search
- Wikidata
View/Edit Human	View/Edit Mouse

Vesicular integral-membrane protein VIP36 is a protein that in humans is encoded by the LMAN2 gene.
