= POLR3G =

Protein-coding gene in the species Homo sapiens

Identifiers
- Aliases: POLR3G, RPC32, RPC7, polymerase (RNA) III subunit G, RNA polymerase III subunit G, C31
- External IDs: OMIM: 617456; MGI: 1914736; GeneCards: POLR3G

Gene location (Human)
Chr.	Chromosome 5 (human)
Band	5q14.3	Start	90,471,748 bp
Band	5q14.3	End	90,514,557 bp

Gene location (Mouse)
Chr.	Chromosome 13 (mouse)
Band	13|13 C3	Start	81,821,962 bp
Band	13|13 C3	End	81,859,132 bp
RNA expression pattern
Bgee	Human / Mouse (ortholog); Top expressed in: spinal ganglia; sural nerve; testicle; tendon of biceps brachii; secondary oocyte; gonad; internal globus pallidus; monocyte; trigeminal ganglion; buccal mucosa cell / Top expressed in: lumbar spinal ganglion; morula; primitive streak; epiblast; esophagus; facial motor nucleus; yolk sac; embryo; embryo; genital tubercle; More reference expression data
BioGPS	n/a
Gene ontology
Molecular function	DNA-directed 5'-3' RNA polymerase activity; protein binding
Cellular component	RNA polymerase III complex; cytosol; nucleoplasm; nucleus; cytoplasm
Biological process	positive regulation of interferon-beta production; immune system process; cell population proliferation; defense response to virus; positive regulation of innate immune response; innate immune response; regulation of transcription by RNA polymerase III; transcription by RNA polymerase III; positive regulation of type I interferon production
Sources:Amigo / QuickGO
Orthologs
Databases	NCBI: entry; OMA: entry
Species	Human	Mouse
Entrez	10622	67486
Ensembl	ENSG00000113356	ENSMUSG00000035834
UniProt	O15318	Q6NXY9
RefSeq (mRNA)	NM_006467; NM_001370351; NM_001370352; NM_001370353; NM_001370354	NM_001081176; NM_026190
RefSeq (protein)	NP_006458; NP_001357280; NP_001357281; NP_001357282; NP_001357283	NP_001074645
Location (UCSC)	Chr 5: 90.47 – 90.51 Mb	Chr 13: 81.82 – 81.86 Mb
PubMed search
- Wikidata
View/Edit Human	View/Edit Mouse

Polymerase (RNA) III (DNA directed) polypeptide G (32kD) is a protein that in humans is encoded by the POLR3G gene.
