= OTULIN =

Protein-coding gene in the species Homo sapiens

Identifiers
- Aliases: OTULIN, FAM105B, GUM, OTU deubiquitinase with linear linkage specificity, AIPDS
- External IDs: OMIM: 615712; MGI: 3577015; GeneCards: OTULIN
Available structures
PDB	Ortholog search: PDBe RCSB
PDB	List of PDB id codes 3ZNV, 3ZNX, 3ZNZ, 4KSJ, 4KSK, 4KSL, 4OYK, 4P0B
Enzyme activity
EC #	BRENDA	ExPASy	KEGG	MetaCyc
3.4.19.12	↗	↗	↗	↗

Gene location (Human)
Chr.	Chromosome 5 (human)
Band	5p15.2	Start	14,664,664 bp
Band	5p15.2	End	14,699,850 bp

Gene location (Mouse)
Chr.	Chromosome 15 (mouse)
Band	15|15 B1	Start	27,542,721 bp
Band	15|15 B1	End	27,630,779 bp
RNA expression pattern
Bgee	Human / Mouse (ortholog); Top expressed in: buccal mucosa cell; bone marrow cell; pancreatic ductal cell; sural nerve; skin of arm; monocyte; Achilles tendon; tonsil; skin of abdomen; skin of leg / Top expressed in: yolk sac; otic vesicle; left lobe of liver; right kidney; saccule; spermatid; granulocyte; soleus muscle; proximal tubule; muscle of thigh; More reference expression data
BioGPS	n/a
Gene ontology
Molecular function	cysteine-type peptidase activity; thiol-dependent deubiquitinase; peptidase activity; protein binding; hydrolase activity
Cellular component	cytosol; LUBAC complex; cytoplasm
Biological process	immune system process; Wnt signaling pathway; proteolysis; nucleotide-binding oligomerization domain containing 2 signaling pathway; angiogenesis; canonical Wnt signaling pathway; sprouting angiogenesis; protein linear deubiquitination; regulation of tumor necrosis factor-mediated signaling pathway; negative regulation of NF-kappaB transcription factor activity; innate immune response; negative regulation of inflammatory response; regulation of canonical Wnt signaling pathway; protein ubiquitination
Sources:Amigo / QuickGO
Orthologs
Databases	NCBI: entry; OMA: entry
Species	Human	Mouse
Entrez	90268	432940
Ensembl	ENSG00000154124	ENSMUSG00000046034
UniProt	Q96BN8	Q3UCV8
RefSeq (mRNA)	NM_138348	NM_001013792
RefSeq (protein)	NP_612357	NP_001013814
Location (UCSC)	Chr 5: 14.66 – 14.7 Mb	Chr 15: 27.54 – 27.63 Mb
PubMed search
- Wikidata
View/Edit Human	View/Edit Mouse

Ubiquitin thioesterase otulin is a protein in humans that is encoded by the OTULIN gene.
