= PHAX =

Protein-coding gene in the species Homo sapiens

Available structures
PDB	Ortholog search: PDBe RCSB
PDB	List of PDB id codes 2XC7

Identifiers
- Aliases: PHAX, RNUXA, phosphorylated adaptor for RNA export
- External IDs: OMIM: 604924; MGI: 1891839; HomoloGene: 10558; GeneCards: PHAX; OMA:PHAX - orthologs

Gene location (Human)
Chr.	Chromosome 5 (human)
Band	5q23.2	Start	126,600,925 bp
Band	5q23.2	End	126,627,252 bp

Gene location (Mouse)
Chr.	Chromosome 18 (mouse)
Band	18 D3|18 30.63 cM	Start	56,695,515 bp
Band	18 D3|18 30.63 cM	End	56,720,784 bp
RNA expression pattern
Bgee	Human / Mouse (ortholog); Top expressed in: buccal mucosa cell; Achilles tendon; endothelial cell; epithelium of colon; ventricular zone; ganglionic eminence; stromal cell of endometrium; smooth muscle tissue; islet of Langerhans; primary visual cortex / Top expressed in: otic placode; saccule; otic vesicle; neural tube; genital tubercle; embryo; abdominal wall; neural layer of retina; epiblast; primitive streak; More reference expression data
BioGPS	n/a
Gene ontology
Molecular function	protein binding; toxic substance binding; RNA binding
Cellular component	nucleoplasm; Cajal body; nucleus; cytosol; soma; cytoplasm; centrosome
Biological process	protein transport; snRNA export from nucleus; snRNA transcription by RNA polymerase II; nuclear export
Sources:Amigo / QuickGO
Orthologs
Species	Human	Mouse
Entrez	51808	56698
Ensembl	ENSG00000164902	ENSMUSG00000008301
UniProt	Q9H814	Q9JJT9
RefSeq (mRNA)	NM_032177	NM_001162989; NM_019996
RefSeq (protein)	NP_115553	NP_001156461; NP_064380
Location (UCSC)	Chr 5: 126.6 – 126.63 Mb	Chr 18: 56.7 – 56.72 Mb
PubMed search
- Wikidata
View/Edit Human	View/Edit Mouse

Phosphorylated adapter RNA export protein is a protein that in humans is encoded by the PHAX gene.
