= GNPDA1 =

Protein-coding gene in the species Homo sapiens

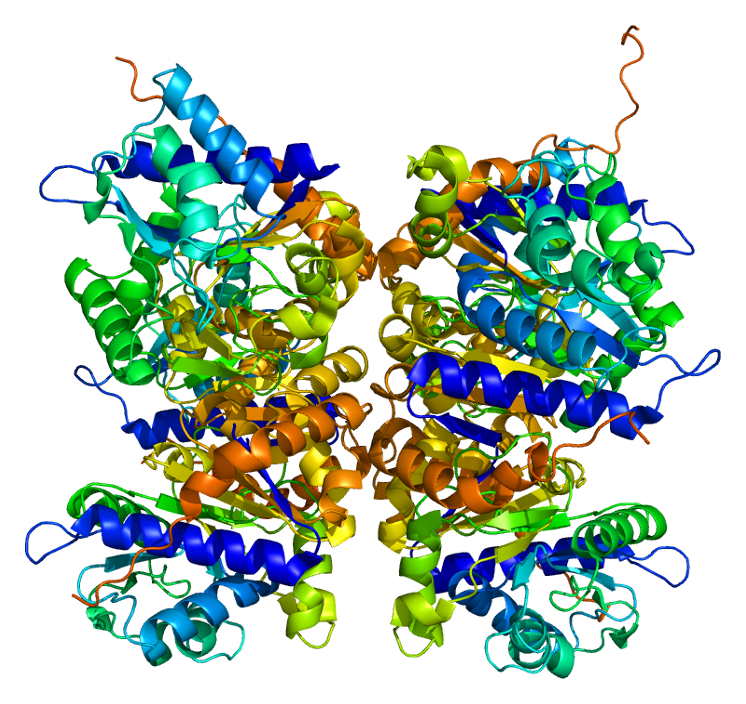
Available structures
PDB	Ortholog search: PDBe RCSB
PDB	List of PDB id codes 1NE7

Identifiers
- Aliases: GNPDA1, GNP1, GNPDA, GNPI, GPI, HLN, glucosamine-6-phosphate deaminase 1
- External IDs: OMIM: 601798; MGI: 1347054; HomoloGene: 38054; GeneCards: GNPDA1; OMA:GNPDA1 - orthologs

Gene location (Human)
Chr.	Chromosome 5 (human)
Band	5q31.3	Start	141,991,749 bp
Band	5q31.3	End	142,013,041 bp

Gene location (Mouse)
Chr.	Chromosome 18 (mouse)
Band	18|18 B3	Start	38,460,588 bp
Band	18|18 B3	End	38,472,056 bp
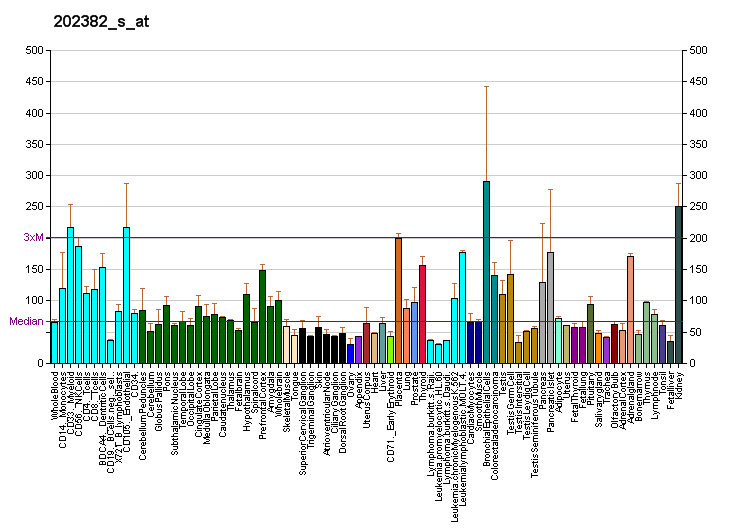
RNA expression pattern
Bgee	Human / Mouse (ortholog); Top expressed in: beta cell; kidney tubule; ventricular zone; right adrenal cortex; retinal pigment epithelium; renal medulla; human kidney; jejunal mucosa; metanephric glomerulus; left adrenal gland / Top expressed in: yolk sac; blastocyst; right kidney; granulocyte; morula; tail of embryo; proximal tubule; neural layer of retina; muscle of thigh; primary visual cortex; More reference expression data
BioGPS	More reference expression data
Gene ontology
Molecular function	protein binding; hydrolase activity; glucosamine-6-phosphate deaminase activity; identical protein binding
Cellular component	extracellular exosome; cytosol; cytoplasm
Biological process	N-acetylglucosamine metabolic process; generation of precursor metabolites and energy; single fertilization; glucosamine catabolic process; carbohydrate metabolic process; N-acetylglucosamine catabolic process; UDP-N-acetylglucosamine biosynthetic process; N-acetylneuraminate catabolic process
Sources:Amigo / QuickGO
Orthologs
Species	Human	Mouse
Entrez	10007	26384
Ensembl	ENSG00000113552	ENSMUSG00000052102
UniProt	P46926	O88958
RefSeq (mRNA)	NM_005471	NM_011937
RefSeq (protein)	NP_005462	NP_036067
Location (UCSC)	Chr 5: 141.99 – 142.01 Mb	Chr 18: 38.46 – 38.47 Mb
PubMed search
- Wikidata
View/Edit Human	View/Edit Mouse

Glucosamine-6-phosphate isomerase 1 is an enzyme that in humans is encoded by the GNPDA1 gene.
