= Ribosome biogenesis protein BRX1 homolog =

BRX1 homelog brid1

BRIX1

Identifiers
- Aliases: BRIX1, BRIX, BXDC2, BRX1, biogenesis of ribosomes, biogenesis of ribosomes BRX1
- External IDs: OMIM: 618466; MGI: 1915082; GeneCards: BRIX1

Gene location (Human)
Chr.	Chromosome 5 (human)
Band	5p13.2	Start	34,915,677 bp
Band	5p13.2	End	34,925,996 bp

Gene location (Mouse)
Chr.	Chromosome 15 (mouse)
Band	15|15 A1	Start	10,474,865 bp
Band	15|15 A1	End	10,486,033 bp
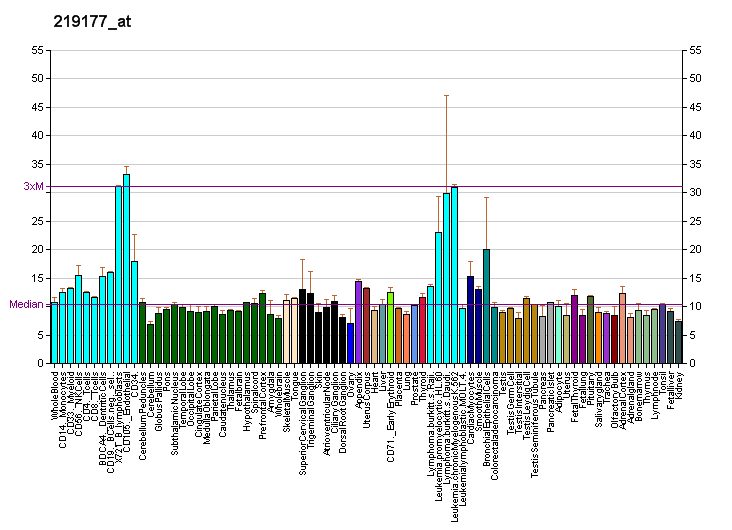
RNA expression pattern
Bgee	Human / Mouse (ortholog); Top expressed in: Achilles tendon; ventricular zone; ganglionic eminence; testicle; islet of Langerhans; olfactory zone of nasal mucosa; gonad; rectum; left uterine tube; mucosa of esophagus / Top expressed in: zygote; secondary oocyte; primary oocyte; morula; morula; primitive streak; epiblast; otic placode; tail of embryo; embryo; More reference expression data
BioGPS	More reference expression data
Gene ontology
Molecular function	RNA binding; protein binding
Cellular component	nucleolus; nucleus
Biological process	ribosome biogenesis; ribosomal large subunit assembly
Sources:Amigo / QuickGO
Orthologs
Databases	NCBI: entry; OMA: entry
Species	Human	Mouse
Entrez	55299	67832
Ensembl	ENSG00000113460	ENSMUSG00000022247
UniProt	Q8TDN6	Q9DCA5
RefSeq (mRNA)	NM_018321	NM_026396
RefSeq (protein)	NP_060791	NP_080672
Location (UCSC)	Chr 5: 34.92 – 34.93 Mb	Chr 15: 10.47 – 10.49 Mb
PubMed search
- Wikidata
View/Edit Human	View/Edit Mouse

Ribosome biogenesis protein BRX1 homolog (BRIX1) also known as brix domain-containing protein 2 (BXDC2) is a protein that in humans is encoded by the BRIX1 gene.
