= RANBP3L =

Mammalian protein found in Homo sapiens

Available structures
PDB	Ortholog search: PDBe RCSB
PDB	List of PDB id codes 2CRF, 2Y8F, 2Y8G

Identifiers
- Aliases: RANBP3L, RAN binding protein 3 like
- External IDs: OMIM: 616391; MGI: 2444654; HomoloGene: 35407; GeneCards: RANBP3L; OMA:RANBP3L - orthologs

Gene location (Human)
Chr.	Chromosome 5 (human)
Band	5p13.2	Start	36,246,913 bp
Band	5p13.2	End	36,302,114 bp
RNA expression pattern
Bgee	Human / Mouse (ortholog); Top expressed in: caudate nucleus; amygdala; putamen; nucleus accumbens; cingulate gyrus; anterior cingulate cortex; right frontal lobe; Brodmann area 9; left coronary artery; popliteal artery / n/a; More reference expression data
BioGPS	n/a
Gene ontology
Molecular function	GTPase activator activity; SMAD binding
Cellular component	centrosome; nucleus; cytoplasm; nuclear pore
Biological process	intracellular transport; RNA export from nucleus; ubiquitin-dependent protein catabolic process; protein import into nucleus; spindle organization; positive regulation of GTPase activity; positive regulation of mitotic centrosome separation; positive regulation of myoblast differentiation; negative regulation of osteoblast differentiation; mesenchymal cell differentiation involved in bone development; G1/S transition of mitotic cell cycle; protein export from nucleus
Sources:Amigo / QuickGO
Orthologs
Species	Human	Mouse
Entrez	202151	223332
Ensembl	ENSG00000164188	ENSMUSG00000048424
UniProt	Q86VV4	Q6PDH4
RefSeq (mRNA)	NM_001161429; NM_145000; NM_001323273; NM_001323274; NM_001323275 NM_001323276; NM_001323277; NM_001323278; NM_001323279; NM_001323280	NM_198024
RefSeq (protein)	NP_001154901; NP_001310202; NP_001310203; NP_001310204; NP_001310205 NP_001310206; NP_001310207; NP_001310208; NP_001310209; NP_659437	NP_932141
Location (UCSC)	Chr 5: 36.25 – 36.3 Mb	n/a
PubMed search
- Wikidata
View/Edit Human	View/Edit Mouse

RAN binding protein 3-like is a protein in humans that is encoded by the RANBP3L gene.
