= GPBP1 =

Protein-coding gene in the species Homo sapiens

Identifiers
- Aliases: GPBP1, GPBP, SSH6, VASCULIN, GC-rich promoter binding protein 1
- External IDs: OMIM: 608412; MGI: 1920524; HomoloGene: 11292; GeneCards: GPBP1; OMA:GPBP1 - orthologs

Gene location (Human)
Chr.	Chromosome 5 (human)
Band	5q11.2	Start	57,173,948 bp
Band	5q11.2	End	57,264,679 bp

Gene location (Mouse)
Chr.	Chromosome 13 (mouse)
Band	13|13 D2.2	Start	111,562,214 bp
Band	13|13 D2.2	End	111,626,645 bp
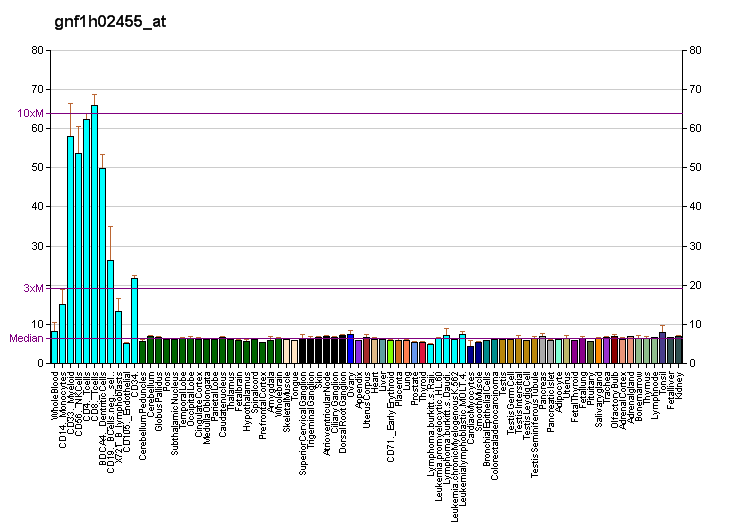
RNA expression pattern
Bgee	Human / Mouse (ortholog); Top expressed in: ventricular zone; cardiac muscle tissue of right atrium; Achilles tendon; corpus callosum; gonad; myocardium of left ventricle; mucosa of paranasal sinus; epithelium of nasopharynx; ganglionic eminence; mucosa of ileum / Top expressed in: zygote; primary oocyte; secondary oocyte; blood; cumulus cell; tail of embryo; spermatid; medial ganglionic eminence; hand; vestibular sensory epithelium; More reference expression data
BioGPS	More reference expression data
Gene ontology
Molecular function	DNA-binding transcription factor activity; DNA binding; protein binding
Cellular component	cytoplasm; intracellular membrane-bounded organelle; nucleus; cytosol; plasma membrane
Biological process	positive regulation of transcription, DNA-templated; regulation of transcription, DNA-templated; transcription, DNA-templated
Sources:Amigo / QuickGO
Orthologs
Species	Human	Mouse
Entrez	65056	73274
Ensembl	ENSG00000062194	ENSMUSG00000032745
UniProt	Q86WP2	Q6NXH3
RefSeq (mRNA)	NM_001127235; NM_001127236; NM_001203246; NM_022913; NM_001331037	NM_001122963; NM_028487; NM_001361923; NM_001361924; NM_001361925 NM_001361926
RefSeq (protein)	NP_001120707; NP_001120708; NP_001190175; NP_001317966; NP_075064	NP_001116435; NP_082763; NP_001348852; NP_001348853; NP_001348854 NP_001348855
Location (UCSC)	Chr 5: 57.17 – 57.26 Mb	Chr 13: 111.56 – 111.63 Mb
PubMed search
- Wikidata
View/Edit Human	View/Edit Mouse

Vasculin is a protein that in humans is encoded by the GPBP1 gene.
