= ANKRD31 =

Protein-coding gene in the species Homo sapiens

Identifiers
- Aliases: ANKRD31, ankyrin repeat domain 31
- External IDs: OMIM: 618423; MGI: 5006716; GeneCards: ANKRD31

Gene location (Human)
Chr.	Chromosome 5 (human)
Band	5q13.3	Start	75,068,275 bp
Band	5q13.3	End	75,236,911 bp

Gene location (Mouse)
Chr.	Chromosome 13 (mouse)
Band	13|13 D1	Start	96,884,780 bp
Band	13|13 D1	End	97,046,547 bp
RNA expression pattern
Bgee	Human / Mouse (ortholog); Top expressed in: testicle; gonad; right testis; left testis; Achilles tendon; ventricular zone; islet of Langerhans; prefrontal cortex; right uterine tube; ganglionic eminence / Top expressed in: spermatocyte; spermatid; zygote; secondary oocyte; embryo; embryo; morula; seminiferous tubule; blastocyst; epiblast; More reference expression data
BioGPS	n/a
Orthologs
Databases	NCBI: entry; OMA: entry
Species	Human	Mouse
Entrez	256006	625662
Ensembl	ENSG00000145700	ENSMUSG00000109561
UniProt	Q8N7Z5	A0A140LI88
RefSeq (mRNA)	NM_001164443; NM_001372053	NM_001370928
RefSeq (protein)	NP_001157915; NP_001358982	NP_001357857
Location (UCSC)	Chr 5: 75.07 – 75.24 Mb	Chr 13: 96.88 – 97.05 Mb
PubMed search
- Wikidata
View/Edit Human	View/Edit Mouse

Ankyrin repeat domain 31 is a protein that in humans is encoded by the ANKRD31 gene.
