= TNFAIP8 =

Protein-coding gene in the species Homo sapiens

Identifiers
- Aliases: TNFAIP8, GG2-1, MDC-3.13, NDED, SCC-S2, SCCS2, TNF alpha induced protein 8
- External IDs: OMIM: 612111; MGI: 2147191; HomoloGene: 8649; GeneCards: TNFAIP8; OMA:TNFAIP8 - orthologs

Gene location (Human)
Chr.	Chromosome 5 (human)
Band	5q23.1	Start	119,268,692 bp
Band	5q23.1	End	119,399,688 bp

Gene location (Mouse)
Chr.	Chromosome 18 (mouse)
Band	18|18 D1	Start	50,112,494 bp
Band	18|18 D1	End	50,240,240 bp
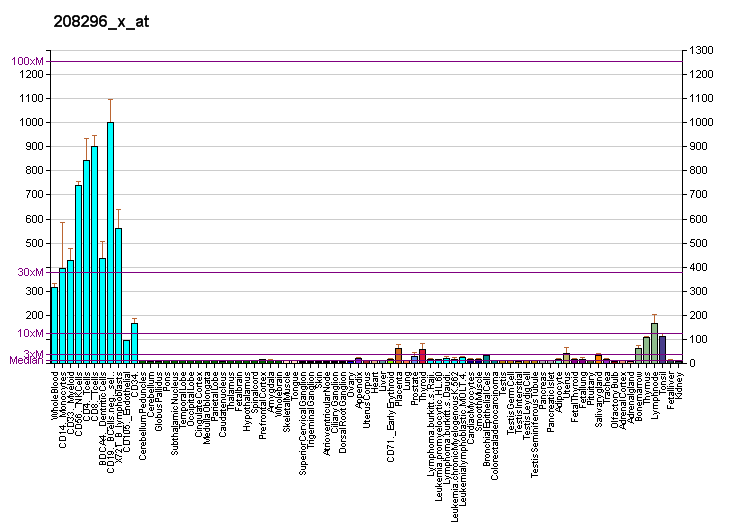

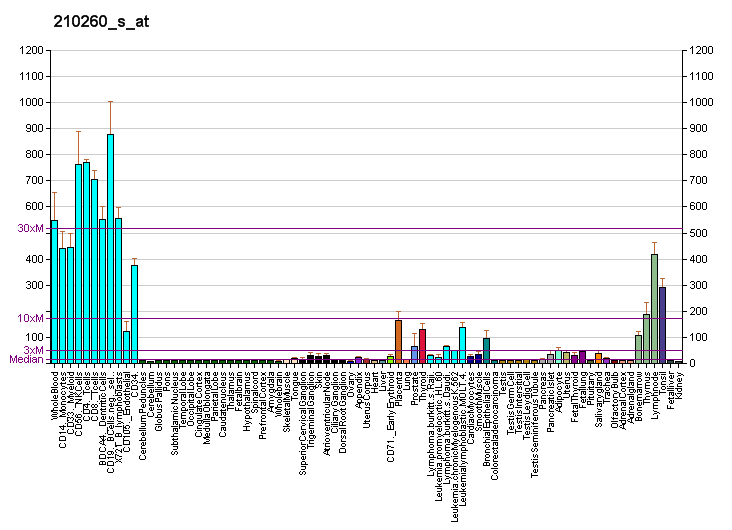
RNA expression pattern
Bgee	Human / Mouse (ortholog); Top expressed in: cartilage tissue; epithelium of nasopharynx; appendix; bone marrow; white blood cell; mononuclear cell; monocyte; lymph node; bone marrow cells; trabecular bone / Top expressed in: gastrula; right kidney; granulocyte; decidua; thymus; human kidney; primary oocyte; spleen; conjunctival fornix; myocardium of ventricle; More reference expression data
BioGPS	More reference expression data
Gene ontology
Molecular function	cysteine-type endopeptidase inhibitor activity involved in apoptotic process; protein binding
Cellular component	cytoplasm; nucleoplasm
Biological process	negative regulation of apoptotic process; apoptotic process; negative regulation of cysteine-type endopeptidase activity involved in apoptotic process; positive regulation of apoptotic process; regulation of apoptotic process
Sources:Amigo / QuickGO
Orthologs
Species	Human	Mouse
Entrez	25816	106869
Ensembl	ENSG00000145779	ENSMUSG00000062210
UniProt	O95379	Q921Z5
RefSeq (mRNA)	NM_014350; NM_001077654; NM_001286813; NM_001286814; NM_001286815 NM_001286817	NM_001177759; NM_001177760; NM_134131; NM_001360935
RefSeq (protein)	NP_001071122; NP_001273742; NP_001273743; NP_001273744; NP_001273746 NP_055165	NP_001171230; NP_001171231; NP_598892; NP_001347864
Location (UCSC)	Chr 5: 119.27 – 119.4 Mb	Chr 18: 50.11 – 50.24 Mb
PubMed search
- Wikidata
View/Edit Human	View/Edit Mouse

Tumor necrosis factor, alpha-induced protein 8 is a protein that in humans is encoded by the TNFAIP8 gene. It is preferentially expressed in human immune cell types.
