= THG1L =

Enzyme

Available structures
PDB	Ortholog search: PDBe RCSB
PDB	List of PDB id codes 3OTB, 3OTC, 3OTD, 3OTE

Identifiers
- Aliases: THG1L, ICF45, IHG-1, hTHG1, tRNA-histidine guanylyltransferase 1 like, SCAR28, IHG1, THG1
- External IDs: MGI: 1913878; HomoloGene: 5959; GeneCards: THG1L; OMA:THG1L - orthologs

Gene location (Human)
Chr.	Chromosome 5 (human)
Band	5q33.3	Start	157,731,420 bp
Band	5q33.3	End	157,741,449 bp

Gene location (Mouse)
Chr.	Chromosome 11 (mouse)
Band	11|11 B1.1	Start	45,837,670 bp
Band	11|11 B1.1	End	45,846,321 bp
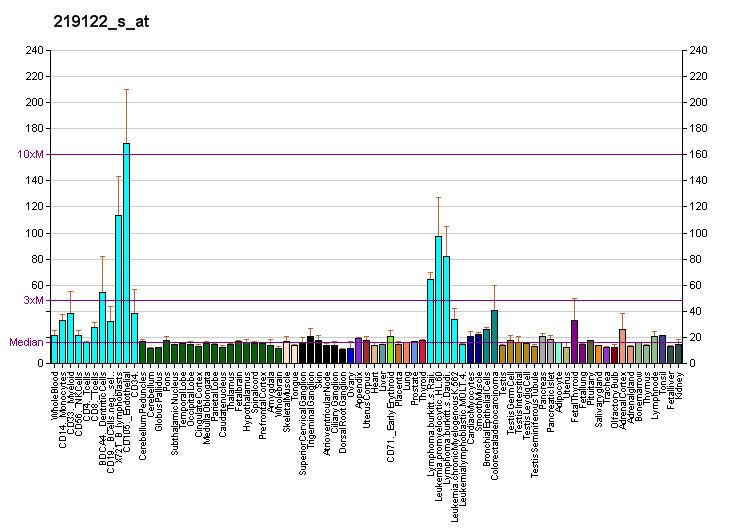
RNA expression pattern
Bgee	Human / Mouse (ortholog); Top expressed in: monocyte; cartilage tissue; stromal cell of endometrium; secondary oocyte; mucosa of transverse colon; rectum; sperm; ventricular zone; testicle; gonad / Top expressed in: spermatocyte; embryo; spermatid; epiblast; yolk sac; zygote; embryo; genital tubercle; tail of embryo; secondary oocyte; More reference expression data
BioGPS	More reference expression data
Gene ontology
Molecular function	transferase activity; nucleotide binding; tRNA binding; GTP binding; protein binding; ATP binding; magnesium ion binding; metal ion binding; tRNA guanylyltransferase activity; identical protein binding; nucleotidyltransferase activity
Cellular component	cytoplasm; cytosol; mitochondrion
Biological process	tRNA modification; protein homotetramerization; tRNA processing; tRNA 5'-end processing
Sources:Amigo / QuickGO
Orthologs
Species	Human	Mouse
Entrez	54974	66628
Ensembl	ENSG00000113272	ENSMUSG00000011254
UniProt	Q9NWX6	Q9CY52
RefSeq (mRNA)	NM_017872; NM_001317824; NM_001317825; NM_001317826	NM_001080969; NM_001290737
RefSeq (protein)	NP_001304753; NP_001304754; NP_001304755; NP_060342	NP_001074438; NP_001277666
Location (UCSC)	Chr 5: 157.73 – 157.74 Mb	Chr 11: 45.84 – 45.85 Mb
PubMed search
- Wikidata
View/Edit Human	View/Edit Mouse

Probable tRNA(His) guanylyltransferase is an enzyme that in humans is encoded by the THG1L gene.
