= CPLX2 =

Protein-coding gene in humans

Identifiers
- Aliases: CPLX2, 921-L, CPX-2, CPX2, Hfb1, complexin 2
- External IDs: OMIM: 605033; MGI: 104726; GeneCards: CPLX2

Gene location (Human)
Chr.	Chromosome 5 (human)
Band	5q35.2	Start	175,796,310 bp
Band	5q35.2	End	175,884,021 bp

Gene location (Mouse)
Chr.	Chromosome 13 (mouse)
Band	13|13 B1	Start	54,519,162 bp
Band	13|13 B1	End	54,531,730 bp
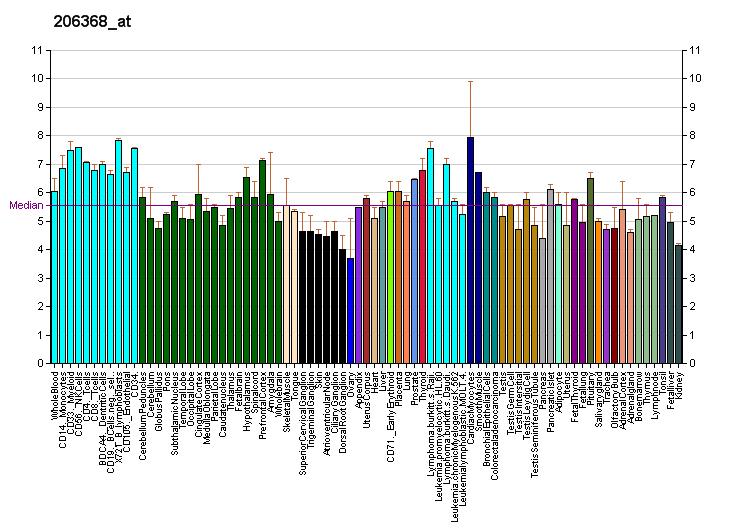
RNA expression pattern
Bgee	Human / Mouse (ortholog); Top expressed in: right hemisphere of cerebellum; right frontal lobe; amygdala; caudate nucleus; anterior cingulate cortex; dorsolateral prefrontal cortex; prefrontal cortex; nucleus accumbens; hippocampus proper; postcentral gyrus / Top expressed in: dentate gyrus of hippocampal formation granule cell; superior frontal gyrus; olfactory tubercle; cerebellar cortex; nucleus accumbens; globus pallidus; subiculum; cerebellar vermis; lobe of cerebellum; piriform cortex; More reference expression data
BioGPS	More reference expression data
Gene ontology
Molecular function	syntaxin-1 binding; syntaxin binding; SNARE binding; calcium-dependent protein binding
Cellular component	cytoplasm; cytosol; synaptobrevin 2-SNAP-25-syntaxin-1a-complexin II complex; mast cell granule; synapse; synaptobrevin 2-SNAP-25-syntaxin-3-complexin complex; soma; dendrite; SNARE complex; presynapse; calyx of Held; postsynapse; glutamatergic synapse; terminal bouton
Biological process	cell differentiation; synaptic vesicle exocytosis; nervous system development; positive regulation of synaptic plasticity; vesicle docking involved in exocytosis; regulation of exocytosis; mast cell degranulation; neurotransmitter transport; exocytosis; regulation of synaptic vesicle fusion to presynaptic active zone membrane; regulation of neurotransmitter secretion
Sources:Amigo / QuickGO
Orthologs
Databases	NCBI: entry; OMA: entry
Species	Human	Mouse
Entrez	10814	12890
Ensembl	ENSG00000145920	ENSMUSG00000025867
UniProt	Q6PUV4	P84086
RefSeq (mRNA)	NM_001008220; NM_006650; NM_032282	NM_009946; NM_001362218
RefSeq (protein)	NP_001008221; NP_006641	NP_034076; NP_001349147
Location (UCSC)	Chr 5: 175.8 – 175.88 Mb	Chr 13: 54.52 – 54.53 Mb
PubMed search
- Wikidata
View/Edit Human	View/Edit Mouse

Complexin-2 is a protein that in humans is encoded by the CPLX2 gene.

Proteins encoded by the complexin/synaphin gene family are cytosolic proteins that function in synaptic vesicle exocytosis. These proteins bind syntaxin, part of the SNAP receptor. The protein product of this gene binds to the SNAP receptor complex and disrupts it, allowing transmitter release. Two transcript variants encoding the same protein have been found for this gene.
