= EIF4E1B =

Protein-coding gene in the species Homo sapiens

Identifiers
- Aliases: EIF4E1B, eukaryotic translation initiation factor 4E family member 1B
- External IDs: MGI: 2685119; HomoloGene: 100945; GeneCards: EIF4E1B; OMA:EIF4E1B - orthologs

Gene location (Human)
Chr.	Chromosome 5 (human)
Band	5q35.2	Start	176,630,618 bp
Band	5q35.2	End	176,646,644 bp

Gene location (Mouse)
Chr.	Chromosome 13 (mouse)
Band	13|13 B1	Start	54,931,811 bp
Band	13|13 B1	End	54,936,272 bp
RNA expression pattern
Bgee	Human / Mouse (ortholog); Top expressed in: testicle; primary visual cortex; prefrontal cortex; superior frontal gyrus; dorsolateral prefrontal cortex; right frontal lobe; Brodmann area 9; anterior cingulate cortex; cerebellum; cerebellar cortex / Top expressed in: secondary oocyte; zygote; primary oocyte; ovary; morula; blastocyst; embryo; quadriceps femoris muscle; uterus; lip; More reference expression data
BioGPS	n/a
Gene ontology
Molecular function	translation initiation factor activity; RNA binding; RNA 7-methylguanosine cap binding
Cellular component	cytoplasm; mRNA cap binding complex; eukaryotic translation initiation factor 4F complex
Biological process	translational initiation; regulation of translation; protein biosynthesis
Sources:Amigo / QuickGO
Orthologs
Species	Human	Mouse
Entrez	253314	218268
Ensembl	ENSG00000175766	ENSMUSG00000074895
UniProt	A6NMX2; D6RHE2	Q3UTA9
RefSeq (mRNA)	NM_001099408; NM_001375362	NM_001033269; NM_001039683; NM_001286178; NM_001286179; NM_001286180
RefSeq (protein)	NP_001092878; NP_001362291	NP_001028441; NP_001034772; NP_001273107; NP_001273108; NP_001273109
Location (UCSC)	Chr 5: 176.63 – 176.65 Mb	Chr 13: 54.93 – 54.94 Mb
PubMed search
- Wikidata
View/Edit Human	View/Edit Mouse

Eukaryotic translation initiation factor 4E family member 1B is a protein in humans that is encoded by the EIF4E1B gene.
