= CFAP90 =

Protein-coding gene in the species Homo sapiens

Identifiers
- Aliases: CFAP90, chromosome 5 open reading frame 49, C5orf49
- External IDs: MGI: 1916565; HomoloGene: 28246; GeneCards: CFAP90; OMA:CFAP90 - orthologs

Gene location (Human)
Chr.	Chromosome 5 (human)
Band	5p15.31	Start	7,830,378 bp
Band	5p15.31	End	7,851,151 bp

Gene location (Mouse)
Chr.	Chromosome 13 (mouse)
Band	13|13 B3	Start	68,745,540 bp
Band	13|13 B3	End	68,762,350 bp
RNA expression pattern
Bgee	Human / Mouse (ortholog); Top expressed in: right uterine tube; olfactory zone of nasal mucosa; bronchial epithelial cell; right testis; left testis; mucosa of paranasal sinus; testicle; sperm; hypothalamus; cingulate gyrus / Top expressed in: spermatid; seminiferous tubule; spermatocyte; morula; dentate gyrus of hippocampal formation granule cell; olfactory epithelium; blastocyst; visual cortex; superior frontal gyrus; ventromedial nucleus; More reference expression data
BioGPS	n/a
Orthologs
Species	Human	Mouse
Entrez	134121	69315
Ensembl	ENSG00000215217	ENSMUSG00000021534
UniProt	A4QMS7	Q9DAR0
RefSeq (mRNA)	NM_001089584	NM_027035
RefSeq (protein)	NP_001083053	NP_081311
Location (UCSC)	Chr 5: 7.83 – 7.85 Mb	Chr 13: 68.75 – 68.76 Mb
PubMed search
- Wikidata
View/Edit Human	View/Edit Mouse

Cilia- and flagella-associated protein 90 is a protein which in humans is encoded by the gene CFAP90 (previously C5orf49). The protein CFAP90 is predicted to localize to the cilia and have ciliary functions.

== Gene ==
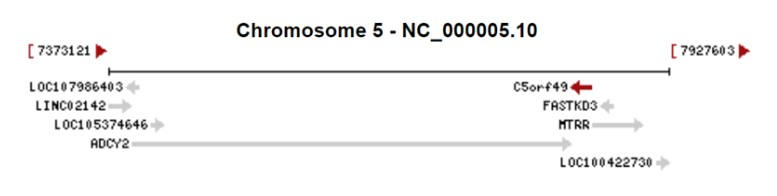
C5orf49 neighboring genes

C5orf49 is found on chromosome 5, cytoband p15 between base pairs 7,830,378 and 7,851,151, meaning it has a length of 20,774 base pairs. This gene has two splice forms, one that is 147 amino acids in length and another that is 145 amino acids in length. C5orf49 is oriented on the minus strand. Neighboring genes of C5orf49 include, FASTKD3, MTRR, and ADCY2.

=== Gene-level regulation ===
==== Promoter ====
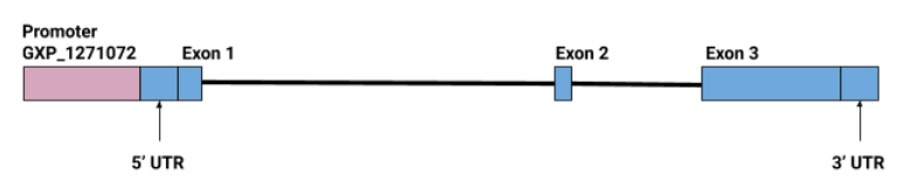
Schematic view of C5orf49 with promoter annotation.

C5orf49 has one upstream promoter, GXP_1271072, that regulates both of the primary transcripts. GXP_1271072 is 1,396 base pairs in length, spanning from base pair 7,851,094 to base pair 7,852,489 on chromosome 5. The transcription start region for the longest transcript of 147 amino acids spans from base pair 7,851,148 to base pair 7,851,164 on chromosome 5.

== Protein ==
=== Structure ===
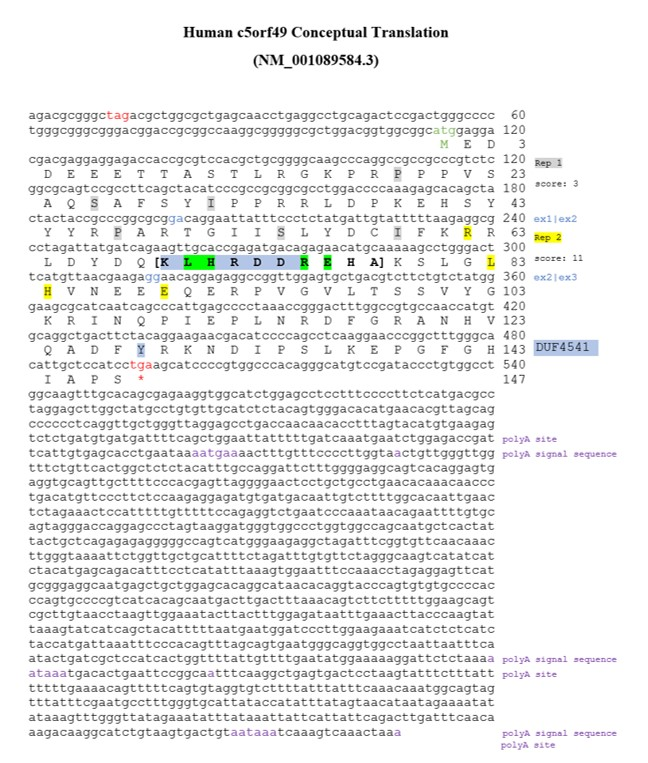
Conceptual translation of C5orf49 with DUF4541 domain

C5orf49 is characterized by the presence of the protein domain DUF4541. Within this protein domain, there is a conserved KLHRDDR sequence motif and a single completely conserved residue Y that may be functionally important. Domain is shown on the annotated conceptual translation.

=== Predicted properties ===
The following properties of C5orf49 were predicted using bioinformatic analysis:

- Molecular Weight: 17 kDa
- Isoelectric point: 7.0
- Post-translational modification: fourteen post-translational modifications are predicted:
  - Seven phosphorylation sites at positions 8, 9, 11, 80, 100, 135, and 147 on the protein sequence
  - Six ubiquitination sites at 16, 39, 69, 104, 137.
  - Two acetylation sites at 39 and 104.
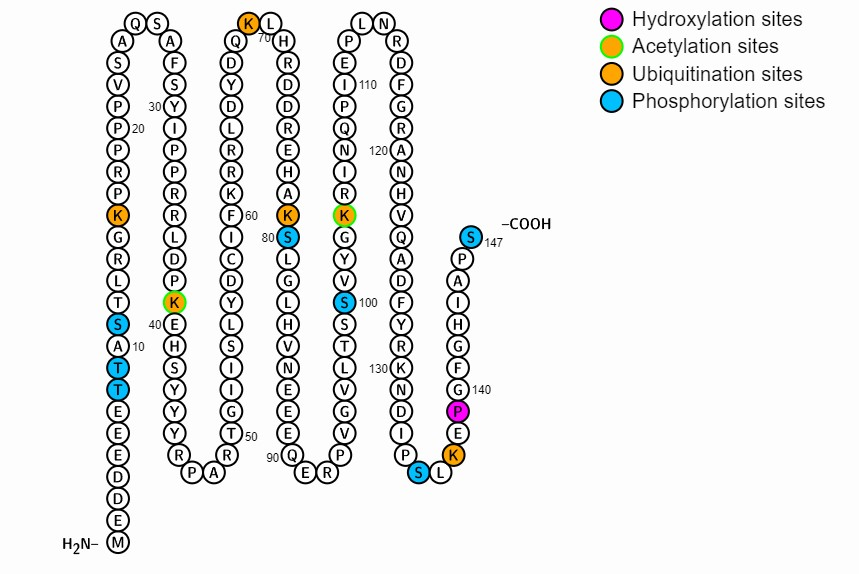
    Post-translational modifications for C5orf49

=== Tissue distribution ===
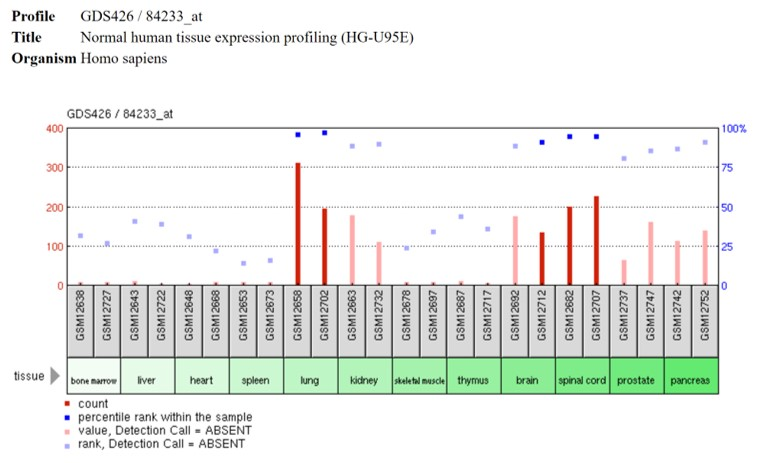
Normal human tissue expression profiling of C5orf49

Expression data indicate expression most significantly in the lung, brain, and spinal cord tissues.

=== Binding partners ===
CDKN2d, HSF2BP, KRT31 and KRT34 were found to be binding partners of C5orf49 by two hybrid prey pooling approach and two hybrid array.

== Species Distribution ==
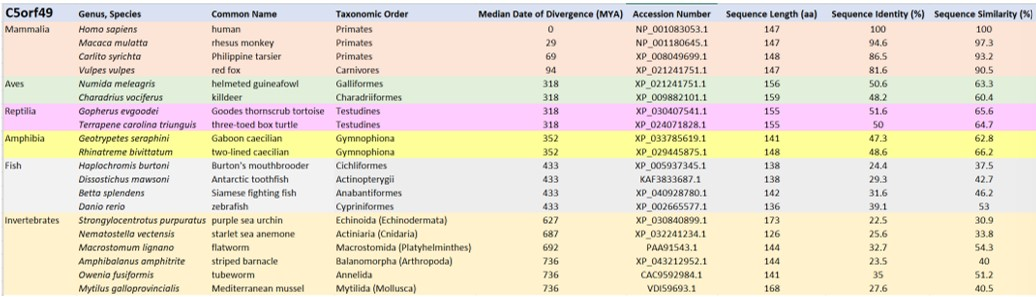
Table of C5orf49 orthologs

C5orf49 shows conservation through mammals and orthologs can be found in flatworms and sea anemone. The table to the right shows a spread of some orthologs found using BLAST. C5orf49 is not found in sponges, which diverged at a median date of 777 million years ago (MYA), and it is found in its most distant ortholog 736 MYA. Therefore, C5orf49 diverged as a gene between 777 MYA and 736 MYA.

== Evolution ==
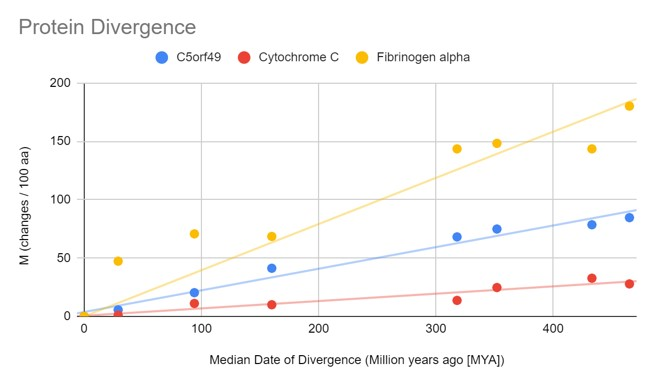
C5orf49 protein divergence graph

C5orf49 does not show a fast or slow evolution rate over time when compared to cytochrome C and fibrinogen alpha. This is shown by the protein divergence graph on the right.
