= YTHDC2 =

Protein-coding gene in humans

Available structures
PDB	Ortholog search: PDBe RCSB
PDB	List of PDB id codes 2YU6

Identifiers
- Aliases: YTHDC2, CAHL, YTH domain containing 2, hYTHDC2
- External IDs: OMIM: 616530; MGI: 2448561; HomoloGene: 11265; GeneCards: YTHDC2; OMA:YTHDC2 - orthologs

Gene location (Human)
Chr.	Chromosome 5 (human)
Band	5q22.2	Start	113,513,694 bp
Band	5q22.2	End	113,595,285 bp

Gene location (Mouse)
Chr.	Chromosome 18 (mouse)
Band	18|18 B3	Start	44,960,813 bp
Band	18|18 B3	End	45,022,791 bp
RNA expression pattern
Bgee	Human / Mouse (ortholog); Top expressed in: endothelial cell; skin of thigh; skin of hip; hair follicle; tibia; Achilles tendon; Epithelium of choroid plexus; epithelium of nasopharynx; Brodmann area 23; germinal epithelium / Top expressed in: secondary oocyte; spermatocyte; zygote; cumulus cell; pineal gland; semi-lunar valve; aortic valve; lumbar spinal ganglion; endothelial cell of lymphatic vessel; tail of embryo; More reference expression data
BioGPS	n/a
Gene ontology
Molecular function	nucleotide binding; protein binding; RNA polymerase binding; ATP binding; hydrolase activity; helicase activity; nucleic acid binding; ATP-dependent activity, acting on RNA; RNA binding; N6-methyladenosine-containing RNA binding; 3'-5' RNA helicase activity
Cellular component	endoplasmic reticulum; cytoplasm; nucleus; ribonucleoprotein granule
Biological process	response to tumor necrosis factor; RNA processing; response to interleukin-1; positive regulation by host of viral genome replication; spermatogenesis; spermatid development; cell differentiation; oogenesis; oocyte development; meiosis; germline cell cycle switching, mitotic to meiotic cell cycle
Sources:Amigo / QuickGO
Orthologs
Species	Human	Mouse
Entrez	64848	240255
Ensembl	ENSG00000047188	ENSMUSG00000034653
UniProt	Q9H6S0	B2RR83
RefSeq (mRNA)	NM_022828; NM_001345975; NM_001345976	NM_001163013
RefSeq (protein)	NP_001332904; NP_001332905; NP_073739	NP_001156485
Location (UCSC)	Chr 5: 113.51 – 113.6 Mb	Chr 18: 44.96 – 45.02 Mb
PubMed search
- Wikidata
View/Edit Human	View/Edit Mouse

YTH domain containing 2 is a protein that in humans is encoded by the YTHDC2 gene.
