= APBB3 =

Protein-coding gene in the species Homo sapiens

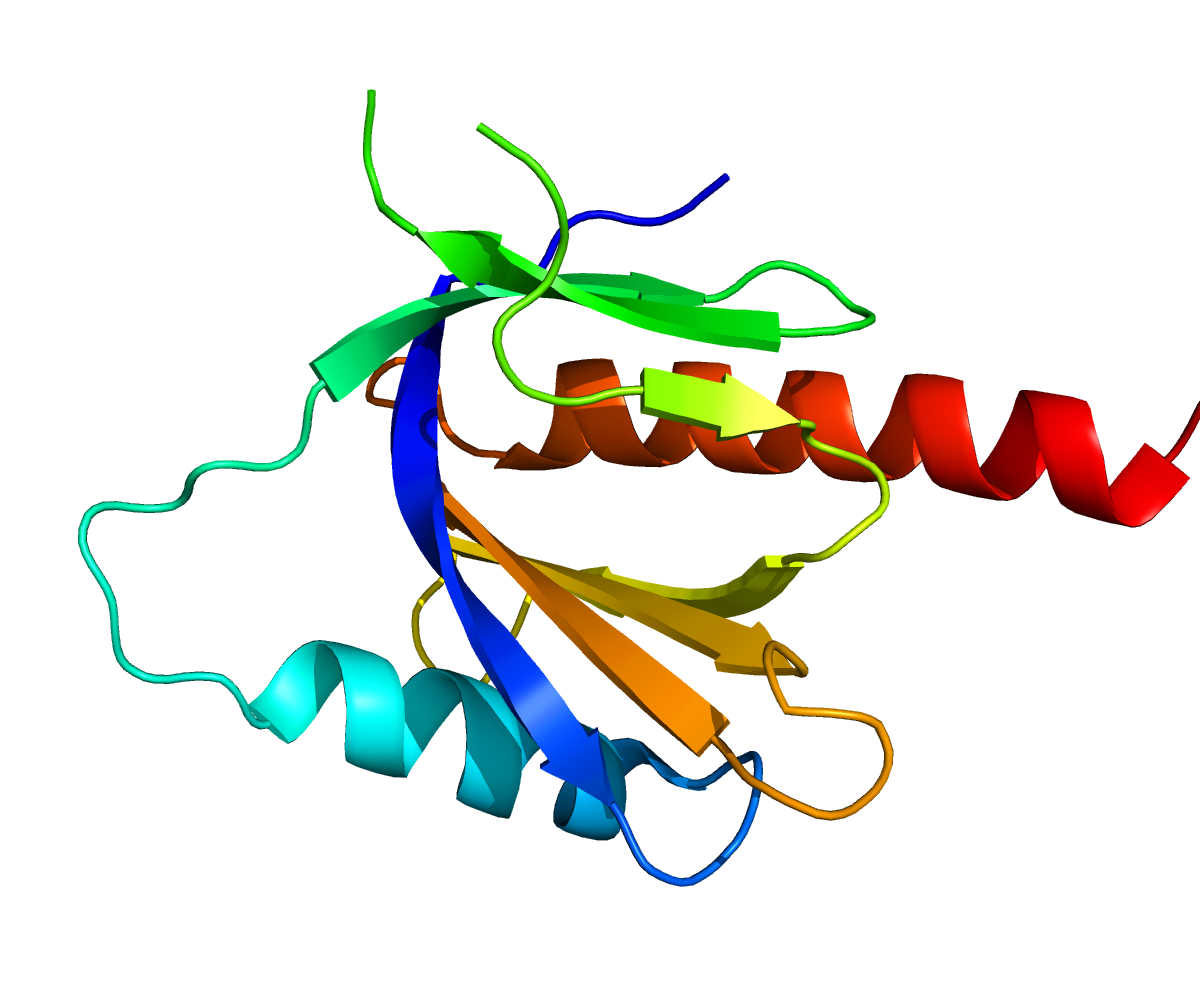
Available structures
PDB	Ortholog search: PDBe RCSB
PDB	List of PDB id codes 2DYQ, 2YSC

Identifiers
- Aliases: APBB3, FE65L2, SRA, amyloid beta precursor protein binding family B member 3
- External IDs: OMIM: 602711; MGI: 108404; HomoloGene: 21221; GeneCards: APBB3; OMA:APBB3 - orthologs

Gene location (Human)
Chr.	Chromosome 5 (human)
Band	5q31.3	Start	140,558,268 bp
Band	5q31.3	End	140,564,781 bp

Gene location (Mouse)
Chr.	Chromosome 18 (mouse)
Band	18|18 B2	Start	36,804,207 bp
Band	18|18 B2	End	36,812,419 bp
RNA expression pattern
Bgee	Human / Mouse (ortholog); Top expressed in: right hemisphere of cerebellum; left ovary; right ovary; right adrenal gland; right testis; right adrenal cortex; left adrenal cortex; left testis; right lobe of thyroid gland; pituitary gland / Top expressed in: neural layer of retina; superior frontal gyrus; primary visual cortex; facial motor nucleus; spermatocyte; muscle of thigh; dentate gyrus of hippocampal formation granule cell; cerebellar cortex; lumbar spinal ganglion; granulocyte; More reference expression data
BioGPS	n/a
Gene ontology
Molecular function	transcription factor binding; amyloid-beta binding; protein binding
Cellular component	nucleus; actin cytoskeleton; cytosol; cytoplasm
Biological process	regulation of transcription, DNA-templated
Sources:Amigo / QuickGO
Orthologs
Species	Human	Mouse
Entrez	10307	225372
Ensembl	ENSG00000113108	ENSMUSG00000117679
UniProt	O95704; Q96DX9	Q8R1C9
RefSeq (mRNA)	NM_133176; NM_006051; NM_133172; NM_133173; NM_133174 NM_133175	NM_146085; NM_001357512
RefSeq (protein)	NP_006042; NP_573418; NP_573419; NP_573420; NP_006042.3 NP_573418.2; NP_573419.2; NP_573420.2	NP_666197; NP_001344441
Location (UCSC)	Chr 5: 140.56 – 140.56 Mb	Chr 18: 36.8 – 36.81 Mb
PubMed search
- Wikidata
View/Edit Human	View/Edit Mouse

Amyloid beta A4 precursor protein-binding family B member 3 is a protein that in humans is encoded by the APBB3 gene.

The protein encoded by this gene is a member of the APBB protein family. It is found in the cytoplasm and binds to the intracellular domain of the Alzheimer's disease beta-amyloid precursor protein (APP) as well as to other APP-like proteins. It is thought that the protein encoded by this gene may modulate the internalization of APP. Multiple transcript variants encoding several different isoforms have been found for this gene.
