= AGXT2 =

Protein-coding gene in humans

Identifiers
- Aliases: AGXT2, AGT2, DAIBAT, alanine--glyoxylate aminotransferase 2, BAIBA
- External IDs: OMIM: 612471; MGI: 2146052; GeneCards: AGXT2
Enzyme activity
EC #	BRENDA	ExPASy	KEGG	MetaCyc
2.6.1.18	↗	↗	↗	↗
2.6.1.40	↗	↗	↗	↗
2.6.1.44	↗	↗	↗	↗

Gene location (Human)
Chr.	Chromosome 5 (human)
Band	5p13.2	Start	34,998,101 bp
Band	5p13.2	End	35,048,135 bp

Gene location (Mouse)
Chr.	Chromosome 15 (mouse)
Band	15|15 A1	Start	10,358,618 bp
Band	15|15 A1	End	10,410,239 bp
RNA expression pattern
Bgee	Human / Mouse (ortholog); Top expressed in: right lobe of liver; renal medulla; renal cortex; human kidney; buccal mucosa cell; jejunal mucosa; gallbladder; duodenum; caput epididymis; muscle tissue / Top expressed in: left lobe of liver; right kidney; human kidney; proximal tubule; embryo; yolk sac; islet of Langerhans; ureter; duodenum; primary visual cortex; More reference expression data
BioGPS	n/a
Gene ontology
Molecular function	transferase activity; (R)-3-amino-2-methylpropionate-pyruvate transaminase activity; pyridoxal phosphate binding; catalytic activity; alanine-glyoxylate transaminase activity; identical protein binding; transaminase activity
Cellular component	mitochondrial matrix; mitochondrion
Biological process	glycine biosynthetic process, by transamination of glyoxylate; positive regulation of nitric oxide biosynthetic process; glyoxylate catabolic process; L-alanine catabolic process, by transamination; glyoxylate metabolic process
Sources:Amigo / QuickGO
Orthologs
Databases	NCBI: entry; OMA: entry
Species	Human	Mouse
Entrez	64902	268782
Ensembl	ENSG00000113492	ENSMUSG00000089678
UniProt	Q9BYV1	Q3UEG6
RefSeq (mRNA)	NM_001306173; NM_031900	NM_001031851; NM_001310735; NM_001310736
RefSeq (protein)	NP_001293102; NP_114106	NP_001027021; NP_001297664; NP_001297665
Location (UCSC)	Chr 5: 35 – 35.05 Mb	Chr 15: 10.36 – 10.41 Mb
PubMed search
- Wikidata
View/Edit Human	View/Edit Mouse

The human AGXT2 gene encodes the protein Alanine—glyoxylate aminotransferase 2.

== Function ==
The protein encoded by this gene is a class III pyridoxal-phosphate-dependent mitochondrial aminotransferase. It catalyzes the conversion of glyoxylate to glycine using L-alanine as the amino donor.
