= IK (gene) =

Protein-coding gene in the species Homo sapiens

Identifiers
- Aliases: IK, CSA2, RED, IK cytokine, down-regulator of HLA II, RER, IK cytokine
- External IDs: OMIM: 600549; MGI: 1345142; GeneCards: IK

Gene location (Human)
Chr.	Chromosome 5 (human)
Band	5q31.3	Start	140,647,058 bp
Band	5q31.3	End	140,662,480 bp

Gene location (Mouse)
Chr.	Chromosome 18 (mouse)
Band	18|18 B2	Start	36,877,709 bp
Band	18|18 B2	End	36,890,692 bp
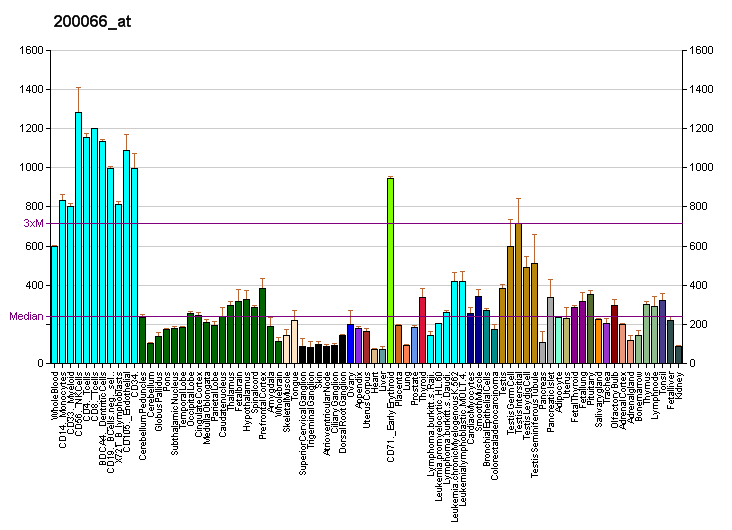
RNA expression pattern
Bgee	Human / Mouse (ortholog); Top expressed in: tendon of biceps brachii; bronchial epithelial cell; right uterine tube; sural nerve; Achilles tendon; olfactory zone of nasal mucosa; epithelium of nasopharynx; left testis; right testis; ganglionic eminence / Top expressed in: genital tubercle; tail of embryo; retinal pigment epithelium; Paneth cell; ciliary body; fossa; condyle; iris; supraoptic nucleus; Epithelium of choroid plexus; More reference expression data
BioGPS	More reference expression data
Gene ontology
Molecular function	protein binding; identical protein binding
Cellular component	nuclear speck; nuclear chromosome; mitotic spindle pole; spindle pole; nucleoplasm; spliceosomal complex; chromosome; cytoplasm; cytoskeleton; nucleus; U2-type precatalytic spliceosome
Biological process	mitotic cell cycle; mitotic spindle assembly checkpoint signaling; protein localization to kinetochore; mRNA processing; RNA splicing; viral process; mRNA splicing, via spliceosome
Sources:Amigo / QuickGO
Orthologs
Databases	NCBI: entry; OMA: entry
Species	Human	Mouse
Entrez	3550	24010
Ensembl	ENSG00000113141	ENSMUSG00000024474
UniProt	Q13123; Q95HA6	Q9Z1M8
RefSeq (mRNA)	NM_006083	NM_011879
RefSeq (protein)	NP_006074; NP_006074.2	NP_036009
Location (UCSC)	Chr 5: 140.65 – 140.66 Mb	Chr 18: 36.88 – 36.89 Mb
PubMed search
- Wikidata
View/Edit Human	View/Edit Mouse

Protein Red is a protein that in humans is encoded by the IK gene.

The protein encoded by this gene was identified by its RED repeat, a stretch of repeated arginine, glutamic acid and aspartic acid residues. The protein localizes to discrete dots within the nucleus, excluding the nucleolus. Its function is unknown. This gene maps to chromosome 5; however, a pseudogene may exist on chromosome 2.
