= Cysteine dioxygenase type 1 =

Protein-coding gene in the species Homo sapiens

CDO1
Available structures
PDB	Ortholog search: PDBe RCSB
PDB	List of PDB id codes 2IC1

Identifiers
- Aliases: CDO1, CDO-I, cysteine dioxygenase type 1
- External IDs: OMIM: 603943; MGI: 105925; HomoloGene: 1365; GeneCards: CDO1; OMA:CDO1 - orthologs

Gene location (Human)
Chr.	Chromosome 5 (human)
Band	5q22.3	Start	115,804,733 bp
Band	5q22.3	End	115,816,659 bp

Gene location (Mouse)
Chr.	Chromosome 18 (mouse)
Band	18 C|18 24.75 cM	Start	46,846,260 bp
Band	18 C|18 24.75 cM	End	46,861,462 bp
RNA expression pattern
Bgee	Human / Mouse (ortholog); Top expressed in: Achilles tendon; ventricular zone; retinal pigment epithelium; corpus epididymis; right lobe of liver; Epithelium of choroid plexus; synovial joint; seminal vesicula; tibial nerve; ganglionic eminence / Top expressed in: seminal vesicula; white adipose tissue; gallbladder; brown adipose tissue; tunica adventitia of aorta; zygote; corneal stroma; lactiferous gland; left lobe of liver; intercostal muscle; More reference expression data
BioGPS	n/a
Gene ontology
Molecular function	iron ion binding; dioxygenase activity; metal ion binding; oxidoreductase activity; ferrous iron binding; oxidoreductase activity, acting on single donors with incorporation of molecular oxygen, incorporation of two atoms of oxygen; cysteine dioxygenase activity
Cellular component	cytosol
Biological process	response to amino acid; response to glucagon; taurine biosynthetic process; cysteine metabolic process; response to glucocorticoid; response to organonitrogen compound; response to cAMP; lactation; response to ethanol; sulfur amino acid biosynthetic process; inflammatory response; L-cysteine catabolic process
Sources:Amigo / QuickGO
Orthologs
Species	Human	Mouse
Entrez	1036	12583
Ensembl	ENSG00000129596	ENSMUSG00000033022
UniProt	Q16878	P60334
RefSeq (mRNA)	NM_001801; NM_001323565; NM_001323566; NM_001323567	NM_033037
RefSeq (protein)	NP_001310494; NP_001310495; NP_001310496; NP_001792	NP_149026
Location (UCSC)	Chr 5: 115.8 – 115.82 Mb	Chr 18: 46.85 – 46.86 Mb
PubMed search
- Wikidata
View/Edit Human	View/Edit Mouse

Cysteine dioxygenase type 1 is a protein that in humans is encoded by the CDO1 gene.
