= Neuronal vesicle trafficking-associated protein 2 =

Protein-coding gene in the species Homo sapiens

NSG2

Identifiers
- Aliases: NSG2, HMP19, HMP19 protein, neuronal vesicle trafficking associated 2, CALY3
- External IDs: OMIM: 616752; MGI: 1202070; GeneCards: NSG2

Gene location (Human)
| Chr. | Chromosome 5 (human) |
| Band | 5q35.2 | Start | 174,045,706 bp |
| Band | 5q35.2 | End | 174,243,501 bp |

Gene location (Mouse)
| Chr. | Chromosome 11 (mouse) |
| Band | 11|11 A4 | Start | 31,950,463 bp |
| Band | 11|11 A4 | End | 32,009,202 bp |
RNA expression pattern
| Bgee | Human / Mouse (ortholog); Top expressed in: nucleus accumbens; ganglionic eminence; caudate nucleus; putamen; amygdala; right frontal lobe; dorsolateral prefrontal cortex; anterior cingulate cortex; prefrontal cortex; hypothalamus / Top expressed in: dentate gyrus of hippocampal formation granule cell; ganglionic eminence; nucleus accumbens; superior frontal gyrus; olfactory tubercle; habenula; olfactory bulb; dorsal striatum; primary visual cortex; medial ganglionic eminence; More reference expression data |
| BioGPS | n/a |
Gene ontology
| Molecular function | clathrin light chain binding |
| Cellular component | Golgi cisterna membrane; membrane; cytoplasmic vesicle; integral component of membrane; endosome; dendrite; lysosome; early endosome; late endosome; Golgi apparatus; endosome membrane; early endosome membrane; late endosome membrane; trans-Golgi network membrane; cell projection; lysosomal lumen; cytoplasmic vesicle membrane; multivesicular body membrane; Golgi cis cisterna membrane |
| Biological process | dopamine receptor signaling pathway; endosomal transport; clathrin coat assembly |
Sources:Amigo / QuickGO
Orthologs
| Databases | NCBI: entry; OMA: entry |
| Species | Human | Mouse |
| Entrez | 51617 | 18197 |
| Ensembl | ENSG00000170091 | ENSMUSG00000020297 |
| UniProt | Q9Y328 | P47759 |
| RefSeq (mRNA) | NM_015980 | NM_001290680; NM_001290681; NM_008741; NM_001347080 |
| RefSeq (protein) | NP_057064 | NP_001277609; NP_001277610; NP_032767; NP_001334009 |
| Location (UCSC) | Chr 5: 174.05 – 174.24 Mb | Chr 11: 31.95 – 32.01 Mb |
| PubMed search |
- Wikidata
| View/Edit Human | View/Edit Mouse |

Neuronal vesicle trafficking-associated protein 2 is a protein that in humans is encoded by the NSG2 gene.
