= LYSMD3 =

Protein-coding gene in the species Homo sapiens

Identifiers
- Aliases: LYSMD3, LysM domain containing 3
- External IDs: MGI: 1915906; HomoloGene: 12722; GeneCards: LYSMD3; OMA:LYSMD3 - orthologs

Gene location (Human)
Chr.	Chromosome 5 (human)
Band	5q14.3	Start	90,515,611 bp
Band	5q14.3	End	90,529,584 bp

Gene location (Mouse)
Chr.	Chromosome 13 (mouse)
Band	13|13 C3	Start	81,805,782 bp
Band	13|13 C3	End	81,820,990 bp
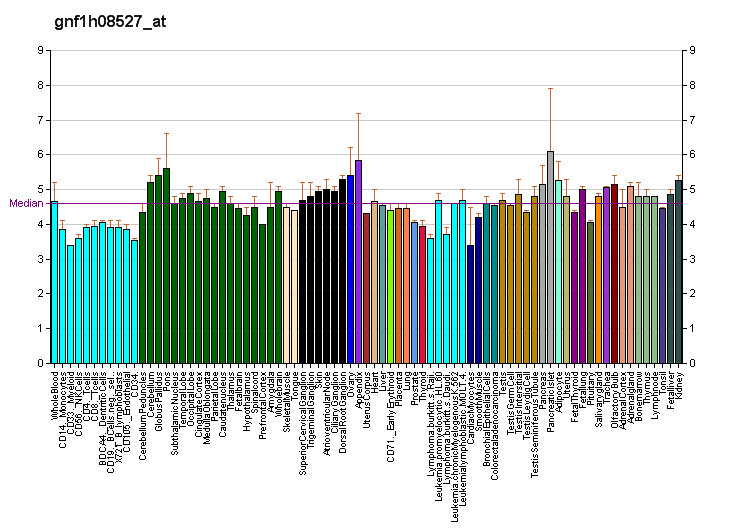
RNA expression pattern
Bgee	Human / Mouse (ortholog); Top expressed in: parietal pleura; mucosa of paranasal sinus; visceral pleura; pancreatic epithelial cell; palpebral conjunctiva; lower lobe of lung; Achilles tendon; germinal epithelium; mucosa of ileum; mucosa of sigmoid colon / Top expressed in: pineal gland; seminal vesicula; intestinal villus; decidua; interventricular septum; jejunum; parotid gland; epithelium of small intestine; Gonadal ridge; lobe of cerebellum; More reference expression data
BioGPS	More reference expression data
Orthologs
Species	Human	Mouse
Entrez	116068	80289
Ensembl	ENSG00000176018	ENSMUSG00000035840
UniProt	Q7Z3D4	Q99LE3
RefSeq (mRNA)	NM_001286812; NM_198273	NM_030257
RefSeq (protein)	NP_001273741; NP_938014	NP_084533
Location (UCSC)	Chr 5: 90.52 – 90.53 Mb	Chr 13: 81.81 – 81.82 Mb
PubMed search
- Wikidata
View/Edit Human	View/Edit Mouse

LysM and putative peptidoglycan-binding domain-containing protein 3 is a protein that in humans is encoded by the LYSMD3 gene. This protein contains a LysM domain.
