= D-Frag! =

Japanese manga series

- Cover of the first manga volume, featuring Roka Shibasaki

ディーふらぐ! (Dīfuragu!)
- Genre: Comedy, harem
- Manga
- Written by: Tomoya Haruno
- Published by: Media Factory
- English publisher: NA: Seven Seas Entertainment
- Magazine: Monthly Comic Alive
- Original run: July 26, 2008 – present
- Volumes: 21
- Anime television series
- Directed by: Seiki Sugawara
- Written by: Makoto Uezu
- Music by: Nijine
- Studio: Brain's Base
- Licensed by: Crunchyroll (Note: In North America via Crunchyroll LLC (then known as Funimation Entertainment) and Australia via Crunchyroll Store Australia (formerly Madman Anime).)
- Original network: TV Tokyo, TVA, TVO, AT-X
- English network: US: Funimation Channel
- Original run: January 6, 2014 – March 24, 2014
- Episodes: 12 + OVA

D-Frag! (Japanese: ディーふらぐ!, Hepburn: Dīfuragu!), also known as D-Fragments, is a Japanese manga series by Tomoya Haruno that began serialization in Media Factory's Monthly Comic Alive in July 2008. A 12-episode anime television series adaptation by Brain's Base aired from January 6 to March 24, 2014.

== Plot ==
The story focuses on a semi-connected series of sketches as delinquent student Kenji Kazama is forced into joining his school's struggling "Game Creation Club" (Game Development Club in the Seven Seas translation) by its members, a quartet of crazy women with their own eccentricities and self-proclaimed elemental affinities that drive him crazy. As he attempts to distance himself from the club, the more he seems to run into not only his fellow club members, but others from his school who drive him insane to different degrees.

== Characters ==
Most main characters' names are reference to railway stations in Tokyo, particularly Keiō Line. Some main character's first names, like Takao's and Funabori's, are not yet revealed.

=== Main characters ===
Kenji Kazama (風間 堅次, Kazama Kenji)
Voiced by: Katsuyuki Konishi (Japanese); Austin Tindle (English)
The leader of the "Kazama Party" and one of the head delinquents in school, he was forcibly recruited into the club after attempting to help them put out a fire. He is actually quite capable of fighting, however because he can never hit a girl he "supposedly" is still no match for the other girls in the club. While not being able to hit a girl, he later starts using trickery and deception to outmatch them in competitions. Later, the club members refer him as "Wind" elemental, due to his name. At all times, he serves as the tsukkomi (comedic straight man) to the antics around him.
Roka Shibasaki (柴崎 芦花, Shibasaki Roka)
Voiced by: Kana Hanazawa (Japanese); Bryn Apprill (English)
The President of the Game Creation Club (Provisional). She has blonde hair. Her element is "Fire", although she later states that her true element is actually "Darkness". Her main combat method is putting a bag over her opponents' head, rendering them blind, hence the darkness element. She carries a lot of spare bags so she can use them anytime. Despite having a small profile, she is referred as "Strongest Darkness" and is the strongest in school. She refers to Kenji as her "important person", and shows jealousy when other girls approach him.
Chitose Karasuyama (烏山 千歳, Karasuyama Chitose)
Voiced by: Chiwa Saitō (Japanese); Whitney Rodgers (English)
A second-year and the President of the student council. Her authority is so great even the teachers fear her. Her element is "Earth", and her main combat method includes punching her opponent, throwing dirt at them, or digging traps. She also has a habit of burying her victims up to the neck.
Sakura Mizukami (水上 桜, Mizukami Sakura)
Voiced by: Mikako Takahashi (Japanese); Megan Shipman (English)
A first-year and a pink-haired tomboy. Her element is "Water", and is usually seen carrying a water bottle. Her combat method includes pouring water on her hands, or forcing water down an opponent's throat. She later starts referring to Kenji and Noe as her siblings, though both of them deny any relation.
Minami Ōsawa (大沢 南, Ōsawa Minami; alt. Minami Ohsawa)
Voiced by: Ami Koshimizu (Japanese); Caitlin Glass (English)
The faculty advisor of the club. Her element is "Lightning" because she carries around a taser. She is shown to be sleeping almost anytime, even in her own class. She also seems to have a fairly poor memory as shown when she cannot remember the name of a past student who lent her the track suit that she wears at all times.
Takao (高尾)
Voiced by: Shizuka Itō (Japanese); Tia Ballard (English)
President of the "real" Game Creation Club with no known first name. Friends with Roka, even though she left and started her own Game Creation Club on negative terms. She has a crush on Kazama. After losing a match with Game Creation Club (Provisional), she actually starts to hang around with the club more often than her own club.

=== Secondary characters ===
==== Real Game Creation Club ====
Tsutsumi Inada (稲田 堤, Inada Tsutsumi)
Voiced by: Megumi Toyoguchi (Japanese); Morgan Garrett (English)
A glasses-wearing girl with a perverted streak who often dresses up Oka in girly outfits. She acts as Chitose's counterpart for the "real" Game Creation Club.
Oka Sakuragaoka (岡桜ヶ丘, Sakuragaoka Oka)
Voiced by: Ryōko Shiraishi (Japanese); Megan Vander Pluym (English)
A boy with a very feminine appearance. Due to a misunderstanding during their first met, Kenji refers to him as a girl, which he never had a chance to correct.
Yamada (山田)
Voiced by: Takahiro Fujiwara (Japanese); Chris Rager (English)
A big, muscular club member. He is described as looking like a brutish giant on the outside, but in reality he is a timid pacifist.

==== Kazama Gang ====
Ataru Kawahara (河原 中, Kawahara Ataru)
Voiced by: Jun Fukuyama (Japanese); J. Michael Tatum (English)
Student council Vice-President with a masochistic streak who both admires and fears Chitose.
Yokoshima (横縞)
Voiced by: Hiroki Gotō (Japanese); Josh Grelle (English)
A short but fat student who is a member of Kazama Gang. Despite his delinquent status, he is very intelligent, scoring second in the school placement test.
Hiroshi Nagayama (長山ひろし, Nagayama Hiroshi)
Voiced by: Kenichirou Matsuda (Japanese); Ian Sinclair (English)
Tall member of the Kazama Gang.

==== Former student council ====
Tama Sakai (境 多摩, Sakai Tama)
Voiced by: Kana Ueda (Japanese); Lindsay Seidel (English)
A junior student, Tama is the ex-Student Council President before Chitose. She has a grudge with Chitose since their childhood and secretly plots to have Game Creation Club (Provisional) disbanded. She specializes in using her twin-tails hairstyle in combat, in which she is renowned as the strongest in Fujou High, capable of fending off Roka, and known as "The Legendary" in other schools. She seems to have an interest in Kenji after losing to him during the competition between ex-student council members and Game Creation Club (Provisional), and starts to participate in the club activities despite not being a club member.
Naganuma (長沼)
Voiced by: Akira Ishida (Japanese); Clifford Chapin (English)
Ex-student council Vice President. Otaku.
Azuma Matsubara (松原 東, Matsubara Azuma)
Voiced by: Yuuko Sanpei (Japanese); Monica Rial (English)
Ex-student council treasurer, courteous but also quite capable of fighting.
Shinsen (神泉)
Voiced by: Eri Sendai (Japanese); Leah Clark (English)
Ex-student council secretary. She has an unstable stomach and often vomits to the point that friends and enemies alike call her "Barfie". She is often shown working many different types of part-time jobs and often runs into the club activities.

==== Others ====
Hachi Shiō (子王 八, Shiō Hachi)
Voiced by: Kōki Miyata (Japanese); Micah Solusod (English)
The club's other male member, he has an unrequited crush on Roka. He often uses the gap between a bookshelf and the wall as his "seat". Other club members refer to him as a "Light" elemental due to the sparkles that seem to surround his appearance. Roka is quite harsh toward him, while most other club members simply ignore him. He later joined the Kazama Gang.
Funabori (船堀)
Voiced by: Aki Toyosaki (Japanese); Felecia Angelle (English)
Kenji's classmate, she is good at housework and often shown doing various chores for the class. Has trouble being the center of attention, and is often blushing when she receives praise from anyone. She has a crush on Kenji.
Noe Kazama (風間 之江, Kazama Noe)
Voiced by: Emiri Katō (Japanese); Jad Saxton (English)
Kenji's little sister who shares her brother's spiky hair and a penchant for being the comedic "straight man" in a world full of crazy punchlines. She is often comforted by Kenji when she can't take the insanity of his daily life. Called an "ice" elemental by members of the Game Creation Club due to her love of ice cream, and has also been referred to as the "little sister" element.
RaGaiGar (ラガイガー)
Voiced by: Nobuyuki Hiyama (Japanese); Scott Freeman (English)
A man who dresses in a tokusatsu outfit and plays a superhero.
Shawn KoneKone (ショーン・コネコネ)
Voiced by: Jōji Nakata (Japanese); Bill Jenkins (English)
Kenji's English Literature teacher. He saved the Kazama Gang (and RaGaiGar) from a flaming building when they were kids. He inspired Kenji to help those who are in need. A parody of real-life actor Sean Connery with elements of Indiana Jones, and supposedly wields the "Dandy" element. In the Seven Seas English edition of the manga, instead of being referred to as Shawn KoneKone, he is called Sean Connery.
Tsutsuji Shibasaki (柴崎 つつじ, Shibasaki Tsutsuji)
Roka's younger(albeit taller) sister who attends another, lower end high school, having failed her exams to enter Fujou High. Has made elaborate lunchboxes for Roka and seeks to "protect" her from Kenji.
Kudanshita (九段下)
A third-year student at Fujou High who has a scary, smiling expression on her face all the time. Despite this, she is actually known throughout the school as a dependable person, and even offers her guidance to Kenji on occasion. She is nicknamed Kusshi (クッシー).

== Media ==
=== Manga ===
Written and illustrated by Tomoya Haruno, the manga began serialization in Media Factory's Monthly Comic Alive in July 2008. The chapters are being collected and released in the tankōbon format by Media Factory. As of November 2026, twenty-one volumes were released. Seven Seas Entertainment has licensed the manga.

| No. | Original release date | Original ISBN | English release date | English ISBN |
|---|---|---|---|---|
| 1 | February 23, 2009 | 978-4-8401-2533-8 | August 5, 2014 | 978-1-62692-070-5 |
1. "It's the Kazama Gang!"; 2. "Pleased to Meet You!"; 3. "One Minute Is All I Need"; 4. "Nothing to Do with Me"; 5. "Still Thinking"; 6. "That's More Fun, Right?"; 7. "Let the Battle Begin!"; "Bonus Manga: The Heroic Adventures of Masochistic Hero Ataru!!"
Kenji Kazama is a delinquent looking to make a name for himself at his school, Fujou High. However, when he stumbles across the all-girl Game Development Club, he finds himself coerced into joining by its members: student council president Chitose Karasuyama, first-year Sakura Mizukami, club advisor Minami Ōsawa, and their diminutive leader Roka Shibasaki. Later, Kenji is confronted by a group claiming to be to the real Game Development Club, whose leader, Takao, informs him that the club he joined is a "fake" one. Kenji learns that Roka had once been in Takao's club, but didn't get along with the other members and quit. Chitose terrorized the other members in retaliation, who dropped out of Takao's club, which nearly disbanded. Chitose then started a separate club with Roka. When the school's cultural festival nears, Takao decides to settle their differences by challenging Roka to a contest over which club can attract the most visitors. While Takao's club develops a video game for the festival, Chitose uses her resources to create an outdoor carnival, which wins the contest. Takao protests, but Chitose apologizes for her past actions, which Takao accepts and concedes defeat, becoming friends with Roka again.
| 2 | October 23, 2009 | 978-4-8401-2929-9 | September 23, 2014 | 978-1-62692-071-2 |
8. "You Know You Wanna Do It, Too"; 9. "Let's Begin the Meeting"; 10. "Oh, That's Me"; 11. "You Can Bet on It"; 12. "I'm Sure of It"; 13. "He's Not Backing Off?!"; 14. "Might as Well Just Do It"; "Bonus Manga: The Heroic Adventures of Masochistic Hero Ataru!!"
Kenji helps Takao evade punishment by his clubmates for losing the cultural festival challenge; she begins to develop a crush on him. Roka's club attempts to change their name to avoid confusion with Takao's club, but discover that due to their own negligence, they already have an official name: The Game Development Club (Temp). Another day, Kenji is encouraged by Sakura to resume his goal of conquering the school, leading him to quit the club and return to his delinquent ways. His gang takes on a group known as the Demon Band of 14, who defeat and hold him prisoner. However they discover he's carrying Cosmic Dirty Magazine Smuggler, a board game created by Roka, and they begin to fight amongst themselves over who gets to play it. The gang's leader, Odawara, destroys the game to stop their infighting, enraging Kenji to attack him. At that moment, Roka, Chitose, Sakura, and Takao arrive and defeat the rest of the gang and free Kenji. Kenji then discovers that Roka is actually a feared shadow boss of the school. Regardless, Kenji rejoins the club.
| 3 | July 23, 2010 | 978-4-8401-3347-0 | December 16, 2014 | 978-1-62692-091-0 |
15. "What the Heck Is That?!"; 16. "Classy!!"; 17. "The Enemy Is Coming!"; 18. "I'd Like to Challenge You to a Game"; 19. "I Don't Want You to Win!"; 20. "Who Would You Rather Fight?"; 21. "If You Don't, I'll Make You Regret It!"; "The Heroic Adventures of Masochistic Hero Ataru!!"
At school, Kenji makes an impression on his classmate, the kind and angelic Funabori, who begins to develop affections for him. Kenji discovers the club has another member, Shio Hachi, the handsome heir to a business conglomerate. Shio is rarely aware of club meetings due to Roka's dislike of him, though he himself is smitten with her. In a scuffle between the three of them, Kenji ends up bagged by Roka. Shio later challenges Kenji over the right to own the bag; Roka and Takao join in on the challenge, which spirals further to become a schoolwide contest. During the preliminary match, Kenji is knocked unconscious by a zipper from Takao's jacket which bursts open, but he is advanced to the semi-finals out of sympathy. Kenji faces Shio in thumb wrestling, while Roka faces Takao in musical chairs; both Kenji and Roka win their matches and advance to the finals. Kenji and Roka play the King Game in the final, which he manages win by tossing the sticks into the air which allows him to seize the king stick. Roka accepts defeat and indicates that any future challenge between them should not involve luck.
| 4 | February 23, 2011 | 978-4-8401-3758-4 | March 10, 2015 | 978-1-62692-117-7 |
22. "It's Developed Into a Major Issue?!"; 23. "I'm So Pathetic"; 24. "Really Incredible"; 25. "That Makes It Even Better!"; 26. "Water!!"; 27. "You're Really Starting to Tick Me Off"; 28. "The Real Thing Sure is Nice"; "Bonus Manga 1"; "Bonus Manga 2"
Takao wants to make things up to Kenji after recent events and invites him out for lunch. However she forgets that it is also the release date of a video game she has been anticipating, and they end up waiting in line instead. Takao runs off when Roka notices Kenji, but Kenji finds her after buying the game for her. Kenji's younger sister Noe visits his club as she is in disbelief he would join one. With only the girls and Takao there, Noe is left in awe by the members, having heard impressive rumors of them all, though an accident occurs which leaves her terrified of Takao. Sakura shows up at the Kazama household and drags the siblings to an on-foot race at a local shrine, where the prize is water from a legendary spring. They find competition from the elderly, Roka and Chitose, and a woman who is actually Takao's mother. As the race progresses, Noe becomes increasingly annoyed with Sakura and decides to win for herself. The race ends inconclusively when it is revealed that the legendary spring was a scam created by the shrine head. Despite the result, Noe makes up with Sakura.
| 5 | December 22, 2011 | 978-4-8401-4078-2 | June 9, 2015 | 978-1-62692-136-8 |
29. "The Legendarily Amazing Takao-sempai!"; 30. "Bumble Tumble Bomp"; 31. "I Guess You Were the Easiest Target?"; 32. "Like, Abolish the Game Dev. Club (Temp)"; 33. "You Can't Crack a Diamond"; 34. "He's Betting That?!"; 35. "She Looks Perfectly Content to Play Alone"; 36. "My Final Move Is..."; "Bonus Manga 1"; "Bonus Manga 2"
Takao attempts to make things right with Noe, but ends up destroying the lunch she was delivering to Kenji. Kenji is ambushed and kidnapped by third-years who were the former student council. Their leader, the pigtailed former president Tama Sakai, aims to abolish the Game Dev. Club (Temp.). Kenji proposes they settle their dispute in a challenge and Takao devises a game of phone tag to be played between the two parties. The groups split up around the school when the game commences. It is revealed that the conflict with Tama began in Chitose and Roka's childhood. The contest comes to a final battle where Tama faces off against Chitose and Kenji; they manage to get past her guard and loosen her pigtails, allowing Roka to bag her. The members of the Game Dev. Club emerge victorious and realize that Tama was simply playing for fun.
| 6 | October 23, 2012 | 978-4-8401-4734-7 | September 8, 2015 | 978-1-62692-172-6 |
37. "Damn You, Sean Connery!!"; 38. "He Was in a Towel!!"; 39. "Call Me Ma'am"; 40. "You Could Say That"; 41. "What Are You Waiting For, Takao-Sempai?"; 42. "They Stood Up!"; 43. "KA-TAK"; 44. "Your Sister Is Lying to You!"; "Bonus Manga"
Recovering from his recent injuries at home, Kenji is visited by his clubmates. They meet Kenji's mother Kiku, and attack his childhood friend and neighbour Mogusa, who they falsely assume is affectionately close to Kenji. Tama arrives and delivers part of their winnings for the previous challenge, ¥10,000. The club goes and collects the rest of the money from the other third-years, but ends up spending most of it during the trip on clothes for Takao, which repeatedly get ruined in various accidents. The rest is spent on a retro game console for Takao, which turns out to be a transforming action figure instead. Shio donates a real version of the console to the club and they start a contest involving a fighting game, which spirals to involve multiple other students. During the contest, Kenji meets the third-year Kudanshita, a scary-faced but well-respected student. When she collapses due to fever, Kenji leaves the room to carry her to the infirmary. Takao and Funabori, who were about to face each other, stand up in concern to Kenji leaving, which pulls the console to the ground, breaking it and ending the contest early. Later, Kenji is confronted by Roka's younger sister Tsutsuji, who is jealous of his relationship with her sister. She demands he leave the club, but he refuses. She then warns him of an mysterious upcoming event involving game clubs from multiple schools.
| 7 | August 10, 2013 | 978-4-8401-5302-7 | December 29, 2015 | 978-1-62692-219-8 |
45. "Let's Have a Hundred Times the Fun Together!!"; 46. "You Just Inhaled What?!"; 47. "Where the Heck Did This Come From?!"; 48. "The Worst Scary Bad Thing in My Life"; 49. "She's Finally Mastered the Art!!"; 50. "Pearl...Waster?"; 51. "This Is the Best!!"; "Bonus Manga 1"; "Bonus Manga 2"
Kenji, Noe, and the club take a ferry to the weekend-long event, which Kenji still knows nothing about. On the way, they meet Hata Takafudou, a student from the all-girls academy Seitachikawa who is also partaking in the event. They arrive at their destination, Famous Athlete Hashimoto's Adventure Island, only to find that its namesake has been kidnapped by four masked figures. The group have captured Hashimoto out of a grudge and challenge the attendees to gather five keys to rescue him. Three keys are quickly recovered by other attendees. Kenji and Roka chase the last kidnapper and retrieve the fourth key, though all three nearly fall off a cliff. The next day, the club heads to the beach, where Takao faces off and wins against Hata in a chicken fight. Kenji discovers Hata dropped a key like the ones the masked figures possessed, but she lets him keep it.
| 8 | December 21, 2013 | 978-4-0406-6192-6 | April 26, 2016 | 978-1-62692-248-8 |
52. "We're So Sorry!!"; 53. "Well Somebody's Totally In On This!!"; 54. "Suck Back Our Luck!"; 55. "How Dare You Sneak That In There?!"; 56. "What Do You Wanna Do?"; 57. "Wh-Who Is He...?!"; 58. "A Gamer's Strength and Weakness"; "Bonus"
The next day, the Game Dev. Club (Temp) arrives to face off against the masked figures, who Hata publicly joins. They reveal themselves to be Hata's classmates from Seitachikawa Academy, who kidnapped Hashimoto due to having their application rejected for last year's event because they are girls, a decision made by girl-shy administrators unrelated to Hashimoto. Hata challenges the club to pick a game of their choosing in order to use the keys to free Hashimoto. Roka picks the only game she has on hand, Cosmic Dirty Magazine Smuggler, which the Seitachikawa girls reluctantly agree to play. As the game progresses, the Seitachikawa group emerge so far in the lead that victory is all but certain for them. Kenji however secretly draws an additional route on the game board which can lead to an instant victory; he manages to roll the precise number needed and wins the game for his club. Hata ultimately accepts the result, but when they go to free Hashimoto, Hata reveals that he had already escaped much earlier. At home, Kenji, irritated by the whole ordeal, finds Hashimoto has slipped a medal into his bag and a message of congratulations, which only annoys him further.
| 8.5 | December 21, 2013 | 978-4-0406-6192-6 | — | — |
Guidebook
| 9 | September 23, 2014 | 978-4-0406-6848-2 (regular ed.); ISBN 978-4-0406-6554-2 (special ed.) | August 2, 2016 | 978-1-62692-285-3 |
59. "Here. Towel."; 60. "It Just Had to Be Her!"; 61. "And Whose Fault Is That?!"; 62. "Oh Wait. I'm Not in This Club."; 63. "Shibasaki-san's Coming, Yo!"; 64. "Now You're Creeping Me Out!"; 65. "Don't Throw Away Your Identity!"; "Bonus Manga 1"; "Bonus Manga 2"
At school, Kenji realizes that Roka has been waiting for him to challenge her to a rematch since their king game battle. When he tells her he had forgotten about it, she begins to avoid coming to club. After receiving encouragement from the other club members and Takao, Kenji decides to challenge Roka head-on. The next day at school, Kenji waits at the entrance gate for Roka. When she arrives, he challenges her to hit and cover rock paper scissors. He allows her to use her bag as a weapon and stipulates that the loser of the throw may also choose any weapon, which would practically ensure Roka use of her most powerful attack. At the game's start, Roka wins the throw and quickly attempts to bag Kenji. However, her bag slips off his head with his hair, revealing that he had been wearing a wig and had shaved his head in advance, much to the shock of everyone. Kenji then picks the mallet and taps Roka, winning the match. Roka is left speechless until she finally crack ups.
| 10 | September 19, 2015 | 978-4-0406-7803-0 | December 27, 2016 | 978-1-62692-365-2 |
66. "Oh, R-Really...?"; 67. "The Future"; 68. "How Strange!"; 69. "We Won't Do It"; 70. "That's Not What We Meant"; 71. "The Rumor That Brought Me Here"; 72. "Space Between Baldies"; 73. "'I Love' Can Do No Wrong"; 74. "I Wish I'd Gotten to Open It"; 75. "That's It for the Flashback"; "Bonus Manga 1"; "Bonus Manga 2"
| 11 | October 22, 2016 | 978-4-0406-7803-0 | April 25, 2017 | 978-1-62692-451-2 |
76. "No, This Story Sounds Way More Suspicious"; 77. "Extra Al Dente It Is, Then"; 78. "He Says It's on the House"; 79. "Whoever Rolls a Seven Wins!"; 80. "Just Don't Make a Racket, Okay?"; 81. "You Can Say..."; 82. "Why Do You Look Happy?!"; 83. "Augh! We All Sat Back Down!"; 84. "Wasn't That a Great Vacation?"; 85. "Plank"; 86. "Do You Want Miso Soup?"; "Bonus Manga 1"; "Bonus Manga 2"
| 12 | August 23, 2017 | 978-4-0406-9441-2 | September 11, 2018 | 978-1-62692-700-1 |
87. "Help Us Build New Sentimental Memories"; 88. "Are You Sure About That?"; 89. "I'll Pay 40,000!"; 90. "Make It a Reduced-Fat One, Please."; 91. "We Won't Let You Face Them Alone"; 92. "This is the Real Thing!"; 93. "All We Have to Do Is Collect All the Stamps, Right?"; 94. "Seitachikawa Girls Are Mean!"; 95. "It Has the Cherry Tomato, Too"; "Bonus Manga"
| 13 | August 23, 2018 | 978-4-0406-5052-4 | July 30, 2019 | 978-1-642751-04-8 |
96. "It's Her Own Fault..."; 97. "Do You Wanna, Like, Do a Little Job for Me?"; 98. "Let's Just Wing It"; 99. "She's Always Like Her Ice Cream Frozen Solid"; 100. "I Love"; 101. "My Word!"; 102. "She Makes It Look Like She Weighs Nothing"; 103. "R-Really...?"; 104. "I Said Stop! It's Dangerous!"; 105. "I'd Like Extra Meat"; "Bonus Story"
| 14 | August 23, 2019 | 978-4-0406-4026-6 | July 28, 2020 | 978-1-64505-494-8 |
106. "Should We Bake It? Maybe Grill It?"; 107. "You Pick and Choose Your Noodles?!"; 108. "Whose Enemy Are You Trying to Be?"; 109. "It's a Waste of Money!"; 110. "Would You Like a Souvenir?"; 111. "What Differences?!"; 112. "Kazama Family Head of Household"; 113. "You Can Say That Again!"; 114. "No Thanks!"; 115. "I Am in the Mood for Eel"; "Bonus Story"
| 15 | September 23, 2020 | 978-4-04-065922-0 | June 22, 2021 | 978-1-64827-234-9 |
116. "Why Don't You Go One at a Time?!"; 117. "Out of Our Field of Expertise"; 118. "Could That Rock Over There Be It?"; 119. "You Take It From Here!!"; 120. "We're In It Together Now"; 121. "I'll Find Some Way to Make It Work"; 122. "Gonna Do It? Gonna Give Up?"; 123. "This Is My Room"; 124. "I Mean, It's This Club Room"; 125. "Give Me Back My Fleeting Summer Romance!"; "Bonus Story"
| 16 | October 21, 2021 | 978-4-04-680795-3 | August 30, 2022 | 978-1-63858-378-3 |
126. "We're Off to a New World Dawn"; 127. "That's Kazama?!"; 128. "I Think They're Probably Ninjas"; 129. "Yeah. I Knew."; 130. "Ooh. Hawt Dad"; 131. "Uh, What's an IRLC?!"; 132. "Still with the 'Bloosh' Plan!"; 133. "What For?!"; 134. "Show Some Grit, Dammit!"; 135. "That's Right! There Was a Secret Boss!"; "Bonus Story"
| 17 | November 22, 2022 | 978-4-04-681880-5 | February 27, 2024 | 978-1-68579-562-7 |
136. "So That's the Kazama Gang"; 137. "Looks Like It's Time to Pay the Piper"; 138. "It's Nothing But Upside!"; 139. "The Great Test of Courage Battle"; 140. "He Threw It!"; 141. "I'mma Marry Her and We'll Be Together Forever an' Ever"; 142. "Be Roomies with Us"; 143. "Spoiler Shield!"; 144. "Spiky Stuff is Cool"; 145. "Order Whatever You Want"; "Bonus Manga"
| 18 | November 22, 2023 | 978-4-04-682957-3 | March 4, 2025 | 979-8-89160-750-7 |
146. "What's This About Moving?"; 147. "It Is One-Hundred-Percent Your Chair!"; 148. "Thing."; 149. "The Shibasaki Family Secret Treasure"; 150. "I Must Compose the Best Apology Essay I Can"; 151. "Many Are the Moths That Will Flock to Flame"; 152. "Our Holy Purity"; 153. "Is This Working?! Like, at All?!"; 154. "Take Our Cookies with You!"; 155. "This Is Nothing at All. Pay It No Mind."
| 19 | December 23, 2024 | 978-4-04-684068-4 | March 10, 2026 | 979-8-89561-520-1 |
| 20 | October 23, 2025 | 978-4-04-685350-9 | March 9, 2027 | 979-8-89863-467-4 |
| 21 | November 20, 2026 | 978-4-04-660690-7 | — | — |

=== Anime ===
An anime television series adaptation by Brain's Base aired from January 6 to March 24, 2014, on TV Tokyo. The series is directed by Seiki Sugawara, Makoto Uezu is in charge of series composition, while Nijine composed the music. Crunchyroll LLC (then known as Funimation) has licensed the series in North America and Australia. As of 2022, it can be streamed on its namesake service.

| No. | Title | Original air date |
|---|---|---|
| 1 | "Kazama's Party"; Transliteration: "Kazama Ippa Da!" (Japanese: 風間一派だ!) | January 6, 2014 |
Kenji Kazama arrives at school looking to leave an impression, but ends up forced into joining the Game Creation Club, from taking out a small fire. Later, the Student Council Vice-President and fourth member of the Kazama Party, Ataru, reveals some backstory about the Student Council President Chitose.
| 2 | "Curse You, Fake Game Creation Club"; Transliteration: "Onore Nisegēmu Seisakubu Me!!" (Japanese: おのれニセゲーム製作部め!!) | January 13, 2014 |
When Kenji is at a park (not at school due to the suspension he got from the events of the first episode), he finds himself confronted by members of the "real" Game Creation Club, claiming the one he joined was a fake club. When he confronts his own club members about it, he discovers that the leaders of both Game Creation Clubs were actually friends in one club, but Roka didn't like how the other members talked about her, so with Chitose's help she started her own club.
| 3 | "Fujou Academy Freedom Festival, AKA FuF Festival"; Transliteration: "Fujō Gakuen Furīdamu Sai. Tsūshō Fufusai" (Japanese: 府上学園フリーダム祭。通称フフ祭) | January 20, 2014 |
As the day of the school festival draws near, the presidents of both Game Creation Clubs prepare to make their own games to show the students at the festival. Takao and Roka agree that the loser's club will be absorbed by the winner, while Chitose threatens to do "that" (an undefined action) to Takao if her club wins. Later that day, Kenji discovers that Takao's club did a decent job of making their own video game, while Takao finds that the "fake" club made a mini-carnival with various analog games, as the rules never specified the type of game they had to make.
| 4 | "They're the Band of 14 Devils!!"; Transliteration: "Are wa Ma no Jūyon Gakudan!!" (Japanese: あれは魔の十四楽団!!) | January 27, 2014 |
After some debate, Minami reveals that the club's official name is "Game Creation Club (Provisional)." While trying to avoid having to play the "Quest for Porn Mags in Space" board game that Roka created, the Kazama Party gets ambushed by the "Band of 14 Devils" (minus two for personal reasons). Despite his best efforts, Kazama and his friends are captured, though Ataru escapes to warn the Game Creation Club (Provisional) about what happened. The club and Takao decide to fake going to the bathroom and rush to Kenji's rescue.
| 5 | "What?! Your Little Sister Makes Your Lunches?!"; Transliteration: "Nanī !? Imōto ni bentō o!?" (Japanese: 何ー!? 妹に弁当を!?) | February 3, 2014 |
Kenji tries to get out of playing the newest edition of "Quest for Porn Mags in Space" again, promising Takao anything if she'll switch places with him. Unfortunately, after striking the deal, Roka reveals that this edition can be played by five people. Later, Chitose bullies Kenji into eating a green pepper off the floor. After lunch, Kenji reveals some backstory about his relationship with legendary Japanese classic literature teacher Shawn Konekone.
| 6 | "So That Means We're in a Love Triangle!"; Transliteration: "Koi no Sankaku Kankei tte Koto Desu ne!" (Japanese: 恋の三角関係ってことですね!) | February 10, 2014 |
Pretty boy and newest Game Creation Club (Provisional) member Shio appears to proclaim his love for Roka, but Roka is only interested in Kenji, and Kenji wants nothing to do with either of them. Later, after Funabori reveals she washed and cleaned one of Roka's bags, Shio, Kenji and Roka decide to have a contest over who owns that bag, and Chitose expands the contest into a school-wide event that begins with a King of the Hill-style tournament.
| 7 | "That's Dirty---!!"; Transliteration: "Kitana!!" (Japanese: 汚なっーーー!!) | February 17, 2014 |
Kenji wakes up after being hit by the zipper from Takao's old uniform to discover that he's locked in a thumb war with Shio as a semifinal match. Meanwhile, Takao and Roka are locked in a game of musical chairs, but seem to have forgotten the chair entirely and are instead tackling each other. The Grand Final round turns out to be a "King's Game," but with only two people the winner is whoever picks the "King" stick.
| 8 | "I Liked The Pixels..."; Transliteration: "Ano Dotto ga Yokatta no ni…" (Japanese: あのドットがよかったのに…) | February 24, 2014 |
Kenji and Takao are informed by a panel of teachers that ever since the zipper incident from the tournament, various students have been injured trying to copy the event with each other. After Kenji stands up for Takao, she later asks him out on a date. Unfortunately, the release date of a popular new game she planned to get falls on the same day, so Kenji ends up waiting in line with her.
| 9 | "That's Right. I'm His Little Sister."; Transliteration: "Sōda yo, Aitsu no Imōto da yo" (Japanese: そうだよ、あいつの妹だよ) | March 3, 2014 |
After getting flustered by Kenji's demands to hide his bag from Shio and Ataru, Funabori ends up preempting the boys by sticking her own head in the bag. Kenji's little sister comes to visit her brother's club room, but ends up getting increasingly scared by the girls inside, then flees after Takao accidentally smacks her against a bookshelf. Takao tries to make nice with her to get closer to Kenji, but her attempts backfire.
| 10 | "Tama-senpai, Long Time No See"; Transliteration: "Tama Senpai, Ohisashiburi" (Japanese: タマ先輩、お久しぶり) | March 10, 2014 |
Kenji gets kidnapped again, this time by the former student council led by senior student Tama. The Game Creation Club and Ataru race to save him, but find themselves facing the Science Club's robot mascot with Shinsen ("Barfy") riding inside. Takao ends up defeating the robot by herself, but when they reach the classroom, Roka finds her usual "darkness" bag attack blocked by Tama's unique twintail hairstyle. Tama demands the Game Creation Club (Provisional) disband, and Kenji proposes a contest to save the club.
| 11 | "What's My Secret Move?"; Transliteration: "Higi tte Nani?" (Japanese: 秘技ってなに?) | March 17, 2014 |
Takao comes up with a contest called "Cell Thievery" where each team tries to snatch an opposing player's cell phone and correctly answer a question about that person written on the phone. Roka demands that Kenji "princess carry" her after Tama's hug from earlier drained most of her strength, and the two of them run away with Sakura, but two of Tama's team are in hot pursuit. Eventually, Roka regains her strength and distracts Naganuma long enough for Kenji to knock him out of the game. Chitose finds herself losing against Tama's strength and needs help. Roka tells Kenji he has a secret move: the "Vertical Jump." Kenji literally jumps up to the second floor and is immediately surrounded by the Basketball Club.
| 12 | "At this Rate, You'll have Zero Friends for All Eternity!"; Transliteration: "Kono Mama da to Tomodachi Eien ni Zeronin da yō" (Japanese: このままだと友達永遠にゼロ人だよぉ) | March 24, 2014 |
Some of the teachers decide to bet over whether the Game Creation Club or the former student council will win their battle. Chitose has a flashback to when she was a kindergartner playing in a sandbox. Every time she tried to build a sandcastle, Tama would come over and smash it, until Roka appeared and helped Chitose bury Tama in sand. Since that day, Chitose swore to one day build a legendary sand castle, and Tama swore to break everything that Chitose loved for her humiliation. In the present, Tama's sumo slap attacks and "double kabuki" technique are keeping both Kenji and Chitose from getting to her cell phone. However, Kenji comes up with a plan that lets him slip past her guard and pull off Tama's hair ribbons, letting Roka subsequently place a bag over her head. The Game Creation Club is declared the winner. Later, Tama plays a round of "Quest for Porn Mags in Space" to get closer to Kenji, while swearing to his club members that her original goals haven't changed.
| 13 (OAD) | "Water!!"; Transliteration: "Wōtā!!" (Japanese: ウォーター!!) | September 23, 2014 |
