= Human genetics =

Study of inheritance as it occurs in human beings

Human genetics is the study of inheritance as it occurs in human beings. Human genetics encompasses a variety of overlapping fields including: classical genetics, cytogenetics, molecular genetics, biochemical genetics, genomics, population genetics, developmental genetics, clinical genetics, and genetic counseling.

Genes are the common factor of the qualities of most human-inherited traits. Study of human genetics can answer questions about human nature, can help understand diseases and the development of effective treatment and help us to understand the genetics of human life. This article describes only basic features of human genetics; for the genetics of disorders please see: medical genetics. For information on the genetics of DNA repair defects related to accelerated aging and/or increased risk of cancer please see: DNA repair-deficiency disorder.

== Genetic differences and inheritance patterns ==
Autosomal dominant pattern, a 50/50 chance

Inheritance of traits for humans are based upon Gregor Mendel's model of inheritance. Mendel deduced that inheritance depends upon discrete units of inheritance, called factors or genes.

=== Autosomal dominant inheritance ===
Autosomal traits are associated with a single gene on an autosome (non-sex chromosome)—they are called "dominant" because a single copy—inherited from either parent—is enough to cause this trait to appear. This often means that one of the parents must also have the same trait, unless it has arisen due to an unlikely new mutation. Examples of autosomal dominant traits and disorders are Huntington's disease and achondroplasia.

=== Autosomal recessive inheritance ===
Autosomal recessive inheritance, a 25% chance, and (purple) a 50% carrier chance.

Autosomal recessive traits is one pattern of inheritance for a trait, disease, or disorder to be passed on through families. For a recessive trait or disease to be displayed two copies of the trait or disorder needs to be presented. The trait or gene will be located on a non-sex chromosome. Because it takes two copies of a trait to display a trait, many people can unknowingly be carriers of a disease. From an evolutionary perspective, a recessive disease or trait can remain hidden for several generations before displaying the phenotype. Examples of autosomal recessive disorders are albinism, cystic fibrosis.

=== X-linked and Y-linked inheritance ===
X-linked genes are found on the sex X chromosome. X-linked genes just like autosomal genes have both dominant and recessive types. Recessive X-linked disorders are rarely seen in females and usually only affect males. This is because males inherit their X chromosome and all X-linked genes will be inherited from the maternal side. Fathers only pass on their Y chromosome to their sons, so no X-linked traits will be inherited from father to son. Men cannot be carriers for recessive X linked traits, as they only have one X chromosome, so any X linked trait inherited from the mother will show up.

Females express X-linked disorders when they are homozygous for the disorder and become carriers when they are heterozygous. X-linked dominant inheritance will show the same phenotype as a heterozygote and homozygote. Just like X-linked inheritance, there will be a lack of male-to-male inheritance, which makes it distinguishable from autosomal traits. One example of an X-linked trait is Coffin–Lowry syndrome, which is caused by a mutation in ribosomal protein gene. This mutation results in skeletal, craniofacial abnormalities, intellectual disability, and short stature.

X chromosomes in females undergo a process known as X inactivation. X inactivation is when one of the two X chromosomes in females is almost completely inactivated. It is important that this process occurs otherwise a woman would produce twice the amount of normal X chromosome proteins. The mechanism for X inactivation will occur during the embryonic stage. For people with disorders like trisomy X, where the genotype has three X chromosomes, X-inactivation will inactivate all X chromosomes until there is only one X chromosome active. Males with Klinefelter syndrome, who have an extra X chromosome, will also undergo X inactivation to have only one completely active X chromosome.

Y-linked inheritance occurs when a gene, trait, or disorder is transferred through the Y chromosome. Since Y chromosomes can only be found in males, Y linked traits are only passed on from father to son. The testis determining factor, which is located on the Y chromosome, determines the maleness of individuals. Besides the maleness inherited in the Y-chromosome there are no other found Y-linked characteristics.

=== Pedigrees analysis ===
An example of a family pedigree displaying an autosomal recessive trait

A pedigree is a diagram showing the ancestral relationships and transmission of genetic traits over several generations in a family. Square symbols are almost always used to represent males, whilst circles are used for females. Pedigrees are used to help detect many different genetic diseases. A pedigree can also be used to help determine the chances for a parent to produce an offspring with a specific trait.

Four different traits can be identified by pedigree chart analysis: autosomal dominant, autosomal recessive, x-linked, or y-linked. Partial penetrance can be shown and calculated from pedigrees. Penetrance is the percentage expressed frequency with which individuals of a given genotype manifest at least some degree of a specific mutant phenotype associated with a trait.

Inbreeding, or mating between closely related organisms, can clearly be seen on pedigree charts. Pedigree charts of royal families often have a high degree of inbreeding, because it was customary and preferable for royalty to marry another member of royalty. Genetic counselors commonly use pedigrees to help couples determine if the parents will be able to produce healthy children.

=== Karyotype ===
Micrographic karyogram of a human male, showing 46 chromosomes including XY sex chromosomes

Schematic karyogram of a human, with annotated bands and sub-bands. It shows dark and white regions on G banding. It shows 22 homologous chromosomes, both the male (XY) and female (XX) versions of the sex chromosome (bottom right), as well as the mitochondrial genome (at bottom left).

A karyotype is a very useful tool in cytogenetics. A karyotype is picture of all the chromosomes in the metaphase stage arranged according to length and centromere position. A karyotype can also be useful in clinical genetics, due to its ability to diagnose genetic disorders. On a normal karyotype, aneuploidy can be detected by clearly being able to observe any missing or extra chromosomes.

Giemsa banding, g-banding, of the karyotype can be used to detect deletions, insertions, duplications, inversions, and translocations. G-banding will stain the chromosomes with light and dark bands unique to each chromosome. A FISH, fluorescent in situ hybridization, can be used to observe deletions, insertions, and translocations. FISH uses fluorescent probes to bind to specific sequences of the chromosomes that will cause the chromosomes to fluoresce a unique color.

== Genomics ==
Genomics is the field of genetics concerned with structural and functional studies of the genome. A genome is all the DNA contained within an organism or a cell including nuclear and mitochondrial DNA. The human genome is the total collection of genes in a human being contained in the human chromosome, composed of over three billion nucleotides. In April 2003, the Human Genome Project was able to sequence all the DNA in the human genome, and to discover that the human genome was composed of around 20,000 protein coding genes.

== Medical genetics ==
Medical genetics is the branch of medicine that involves the diagnosis and management of hereditary disorders. Medical genetics is the application of genetics to medical care. It overlaps human genetics, for example, research on the causes and inheritance of genetic disorders would be considered within both human genetics and medical genetics, while the diagnosis, management, and counseling of individuals with genetic disorders would be considered part of medical genetics.

== Population genetics ==
Population genetics is the branch of evolutionary biology responsible for investigating processes that cause changes in allele and genotype frequencies in populations based upon Mendelian inheritance. Four different forces can influence the frequencies: natural selection, mutation, gene flow (migration), and genetic drift. A population can be defined as a group of interbreeding individuals and their offspring. For human genetics the populations will consist only of the human species. The Hardy–Weinberg principle is a widely used principle to determine allelic and genotype frequencies.

== Mitochondrial DNA ==
In addition to nuclear DNA, humans (like almost all eukaryotes) have mitochondrial DNA. Mitochondria, the "power houses" of a cell, have their own DNA. Mitochondria are inherited from one's mother, and their DNA is frequently used to trace maternal lines of descent (see mitochondrial Eve). Mitochondrial DNA is only 16kb in length and encodes for 62 genes.

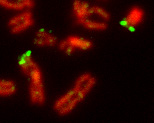
XY Chromosomes

=== Genes and sex ===
The XY sex-determination system is the sex-determination system found in humans, most other mammals, some insects (Drosophila), and some plants (Ginkgo). In this system, the sex of an individual is determined by a pair of sex chromosomes (gonosomes). Females have two of the same kind of sex chromosome (XX), and are called the homogametic sex. Males have two distinct sex chromosomes (XY), and are called the heterogametic sex.

=== X-linked traits ===
Sex linkage is the phenotypic expression of an allele related to the chromosomal sex of the individual. This mode of inheritance is in contrast to the inheritance of traits on autosomal chromosomes, where both sexes have the same probability of inheritance. Since humans have many more genes on the X than the Y, there are many more X-linked traits than Y-linked traits. However, females carry two or more copies of the X chromosome, resulting in a potentially toxic dose of X-linked genes.

To correct this imbalance, mammalian females have evolved a unique mechanism of dosage compensation. In particular, by way of the process called X-chromosome inactivation (XCI), female mammals transcriptionally silence one of their two Xs in a complex and highly coordinated manner.

X-link dominant	X-link recessive	References
Alport syndrome	Absence of blood in urine
Coffin–Lowry syndrome	No cranial malformations
Colour vision	Colour blindness
Normal clotting factor	Haemophilia A & B
Strong muscle tissue	Duchenne muscular dystrophy
fragile X syndrome	Normal X chromosome
Aicardi syndrome	Absence of brain defects
Absence of autoimmunity	IPEX syndrome
Xg blood type	Absence of antigen
Production of GAGs	Hunter syndrome
Normal muscle strength	Becker's Muscular Dystrophy
Unaffected body	Fabry's disease
No progressive blindness	Choroideremia
No kidney damage	Dent's disease
Rett syndrome	No microcephaly
Production of HGPRT	Lesch–Nyhan syndrome
High levels of copper	Menkes disease
Normal immune levels	Wiskott–Aldrich syndrome
Focal dermal hypoplasia	Normal pigmented skin
Normal pigment in eyes	Ocular albinism
Vitamin D resistant rickets	Absorption of Vitamin D
Synesthesia	Non colour perception

=== Human traits with possible monogenic or oligogenic inheritance patterns ===
Dominant	Recessive	References
Low heart rate	High heart rate
Widow's peak	straight hair line
ocular hypertelorism	Hypotelorism
Normal digestive muscle	POLIP syndrome
Facial dimples *	No facial dimples
Able to taste PTC	Unable to taste PTC
Unattached (free) earlobe	Attached earlobe
Clockwise hair direction (left to right)	Counter-Clockwise hair direction (right to left)
Cleft chin	smooth chin
No progressive nerve damage	Friedreich's ataxia
Ability to roll tongue (Able to hold tongue in a U shape)	No ability to roll tongue
extra finger or toe	Normal five fingers and toes
Straight Thumb	Hitchhiker's Thumb
Freckles	No freckles
Wet-type earwax	Dry-type earwax
Normal flat palm	Cenani Lenz syndactylism
shortness in fingers	Normal finger length
Webbed fingers	Normal separated fingers
Roman nose	No prominent bridge
Marfan's syndrome	Normal body proportions
Huntington's disease	No nerve damage
Normal mucous lining	Cystic fibrosis
Photic sneeze reflex	No ACHOO reflex
Forged chin	Receding chin
White Forelock	Dark Forelock
Ligamentous angustus	Ligamentous Laxity
Ability to eat sugar	Galactosemia
Total leukonychia and Bart pumphrey syndrome	partial leukonychia
Absence of fish-like body odour	Trimethylaminuria
Primary Hyperhidrosis	little sweating in hands
Lactose persistence *	Lactose intolerance *
Prominent chin (V-shaped)	less prominent chin (U-shaped)
Acne prone	Clear complexion
Normal height	Cartilage–hair hypoplasia

=== Disabling conditions ===
Genetic
Chromosomal

Effect	Source	References
Down syndrome	Additional 21st chromosome
Cri du chat syndrome	Partial deletion of a chromosome in the B Group
Klinefelter syndrome	One or more extra sex chromosome(s)
Turner syndrome	Rearrangement of one or both X chromosomes, deletion of part of the second X chromosome, presence of part of a Y chromosome

== See also ==
- DNA repair-deficiency disorder
- Human evolutionary genetics
- Human genome
- List of Mendelian traits in humans
- Johns Hopkins Human Genetics Program
