= Digitus primus =

Digitus primus ('first digit') may refer to:

- Digitus primus manus, the thumb
- Digitus primus pedis, the big toe
