= Maha Pattapola =

Maha Pattapola( මහ පට්ටපොල)
- Village
- thumb
- Country: Sri Lanka
- Province: Central Province
- Time zone: UTC+5:30 (Sri Lanka Standard Time)

Maha Pattapola is a village in Sri Lanka. It is located within Central Province.

== See also ==
- List of towns in Central Province, Sri Lanka
