= Achondrogenesis type 1B =

- Achondrogenesis type 1B has an autosomal recessive mode of inheritance.
- Specialty: Medical genetics

Achondrogenesis type 1B is a severe autosomal recessive skeletal disorder, invariably fatal in the perinatal period. It is distinguished by its elongated, spherical midsection, small chest, and exceedingly short limbs. The feet can turn inward and upward (clubfeet), and the fingers and toes are little. Babies affected often have a soft out-pouching at the groin (an inguinal hernia) or around the belly button (an umbilical hernia).

== Signs and symptoms ==
Achondrogenesis type 1B (ACG1B), one of the most serious forms of chondrodysplasia, is a perinatal-lethal condition in which a person dies either during pregnancy or soon after birth. It is uncertain what mechanism causes perinatal death. Shortly after birth, respiratory failure results in the death of a live-born neonate.

Breech births are common in fetuses with ACG1B. Polyhydramnios can lead to pregnancy issues, such as maternal respiratory difficulties and preterm labor.

Since their skeletons are so small, infants with ACG1B appear hydropic and have a lot of soft tissue. The neck is short and has thicker soft tissue, while the face is flat. The limbs are severely shortened, with brachydactyly (short, stubby fingers and toes) and inturning of the foot and toes (talipes equinovarus). The abdomen protrudes, and the thorax is thin. Inguinal or umbilical hernias are commonly seen.

== Causes ==
Achondrogenesis type 1B is the most severe of several skeletal abnormalities induced by mutations in the SLC26A2 gene. Instructions for producing a protein necessary for appropriate cartilage formation and bone conversion are provided by this gene. Because mutations in the SLC26A2 gene alter the structure of growing cartilage, improper bone formation occurs, leading to the skeletal issues typical with achondrogenesis type 1B.

Because achondrogenesis type 1B is inherited in an autosomal recessive manner, each cell's two copies of the SLC26A2 gene are mutated. A person with an autosomal recessive disorder typically has parents who each carry one copy of the defective gene but do not exhibit the condition's symptoms.

== Diagnosis ==
Molecular genetic testing can identify biallelic pathogenic (or potentially pathogenic) mutations in SLC26A2 and/or the distinctive clinical and radiographic features in a proband that support the diagnosis of ACG1B.

== See also ==
- Diastrophic dysplasia
- Achondrogenesis type 1A
