= Diastrophic dysplasia =

- Other names: DTD
- Specialty: Medical genetics
- Duration: Life-long
- Causes: Mutations in the SLC26A2 gene
- Frequency: Around 1 in 500,000 live births

Diastrophic dysplasia is an autosomal recessive dysplasia which affects cartilage and bone development. ("Diastrophism" is a general word referring to a twisting.) Diastrophic dysplasia is due to mutations in the SLC26A2 gene.

Affected individuals have short stature with very short arms and legs and joint problems that restrict mobility.

== Signs and symptoms ==
This condition is also characterized by an unusual clubfoot with twisting of the metatarsals, inward and upward-turning foot, tarsus varus and inversion adducted appearances. Furthermore, they classically present with scoliosis (progressive curvature of the spine) and unusually positioned thumbs (hitchhiker's thumbs). Around half of infants with diastrophic dysplasia are born with an opening in the roof of the mouth called a cleft palate. Swelling of the external ears is also common in newborns and can lead to thickened, deformed ears.

The signs and symptoms of diastrophic dysplasia are similar to those of another skeletal disorder called atelosteogenesis, type 2; however diastrophic dysplasia tends to be less severe.

== Genetic ==
Diastrophic dysplasia has an autosomal recessive pattern of inheritance.

It is one of a spectrum of skeletal disorders caused by mutations in the SLC26A2 gene. The protein encoded by this gene is essential for the normal development of cartilage and for its conversion to bone. Cartilage is a tough, flexible tissue that makes up much of the skeleton during early development. Most cartilage is later converted to bone, but in adulthood this tissue continues to cover and protect the ends of bones and is present in the nose and ears. Mutations in the SLC26A2 gene alter the structure of developing cartilage, preventing bones from forming properly and resulting in the skeletal problems characteristic of diastrophic dysplasia.

This condition is an autosomal recessive disorder, meaning that the defective gene is located on an autosome, and both parents must carry one copy of the defective gene in order to have a child born with the disorder. The parents of a child with an autosomal recessive disorder are usually not affected by the disorder.

== Prevalence ==
Diastrophic dysplasia affects about one in 500,000 births, however; in Finland, this disorder is more common, with about in 1 in 33,000 births being affected by the disorder.

== See also ==
- Achondrogenesis type 1B
