= Sulfate transporter =

Protein-coding gene in the species Homo sapiens

SLC26A2

Identifiers
- Aliases: SLC26A2, D5S1708, DTD, DTDST, EDM4, MST153, MSTP157, solute carrier family 26 member 2
- External IDs: OMIM: 606718; MGI: 892977; GeneCards: SLC26A2

Gene location (Human)
Chr.	Chromosome 5 (human)
Band	5q32	Start	149,960,758 bp
Band	5q32	End	149,993,455 bp

Gene location (Mouse)
Chr.	Chromosome 18 (mouse)
Band	18|18 E1	Start	61,325,991 bp
Band	18|18 E1	End	61,344,684 bp
RNA expression pattern
Bgee	Human / Mouse (ortholog); Top expressed in: mucosa of colon; mucosa of sigmoid colon; mucosa of transverse colon; rectum; seminal vesicula; mucosa of paranasal sinus; trigeminal ganglion; mucosa of ileum; skin of thigh; corpus epididymis / Top expressed in: left colon; lacrimal gland; ileum; epithelium of stomach; salivary gland; parotid gland; transitional epithelium of urinary bladder; jejunum; rib; submandibular gland; More reference expression data
BioGPS	n/a
Gene ontology
Molecular function	secondary active sulfate transmembrane transporter activity; bicarbonate transmembrane transporter activity; oxalate transmembrane transporter activity; chloride channel activity; sulfate transmembrane transporter activity; chloride transmembrane transporter activity
Cellular component	integral component of membrane; membrane; extracellular exosome; integral component of plasma membrane; plasma membrane; apical plasma membrane; microvillus membrane
Biological process	ossification; regulation of membrane potential; regulation of intracellular pH; chloride transmembrane transport; ion transport; bicarbonate transport; 3'-phosphoadenosine 5'-phosphosulfate biosynthetic process; oxalate transport; transmembrane transport; sulfate transport; sulfate transmembrane transport; transport
Sources:Amigo / QuickGO
Orthologs
Databases	NCBI: entry; OMA: entry
Species	Human	Mouse
Entrez	1836	13521
Ensembl	ENSG00000155850	ENSMUSG00000034320
UniProt	P50443	Q62273
RefSeq (mRNA)	NM_000112	NM_007885
RefSeq (protein)	NP_000103	NP_031911
Location (UCSC)	Chr 5: 149.96 – 149.99 Mb	Chr 18: 61.33 – 61.34 Mb
PubMed search
- Wikidata
View/Edit Human	View/Edit Mouse

The sulfate transporter is a solute carrier family protein that in humans is encoded by the SLC26A2 gene. SLC26A2 is also called the diastrophic dysplasia sulfate transporter (DTDST), and was first described by Hästbacka et al. in 1994. A defect in sulfate activation described by Superti-Furga in achondrogenesis type 1B was subsequently also found to be caused by genetic variants in the sulfate transporter gene. This sulfate (SO^{2−}_{4}) transporter also accepts chloride, hydroxyl ions (OH^{−}), and oxalate as substrates. SLC26A2 is expressed at high levels in developing and mature cartilage, as well as being expressed in lung, placenta, colon, kidney, pancreas and testis.

== Function ==
The diastrophic dysplasia sulfate transporter is a transmembrane glycoprotein implicated in the pathogenesis of several human chondrodysplasias. In chondrocytes, SLC26A2 functions to transport most of the cellular sulfate, which is critical for the sulfation of proteoglycans and normal cartilage formation. In addition, studies have demonstrated that SLC26A2 influences chondrocyte proliferation, differentiation, and growth, suggesting that in the chondrocyte, SLC26A2 provides sulfate for both structural and regulatory proteins.

== Clinical significance ==
Deficiencies are associated with many forms of osteochondrodysplasia.

These include:

- achondrogenesis type 1B
- diastrophic dysplasia
- atelosteogenesis, type II
- recessive multiple epiphyseal dysplasia

=== Correlation between genotype and phenotype ===
Since its first description, over 30 mutations in the SLC26A2 gene have been described in the four recessively inherited chondrodysplasias listed above. Achondrogenesis 1B (ACG-1B) is the most severe form of these chondrodysplasias, resulting in skeletal underdevelopment and death preceding or shortly after birth. Atelosteogenesis type II (AO-II) can be lethal in the neonatal period, whereas diastrophic dysplasia (DTD) and autosomal recessive multiple epiphyseal dysplasia (EDM4/rMED) are considered to be the least severe forms.

When ten previously described SLC26A2 mutation were expressed in mammalian cells, a strong correlation was found between the amount of sulfate transport activity of the mutated protein and the severity of the phenotype in patients where these mutations have been identified. For example, a mutation that results in a non-functional protein on both alleles was always found with the severe ACG-IB phenotype, but non-functional mutations on both alleles were never found with the less severe phenotypes, DTD and rMED. Mutations found in the moderately severe AO-II phenotype were always the result of a non-functioning mutation on one allele and a partial-functioning mutation on the opposite allele. In contrast, mutations described in the mildest form of the chondrodysplasia, rMED, result in proteins that retain at least some partial sulfate transport function on both alleles. This suggests that even a small amount of SLC26A2-mediated sulfate transport in chondrocytes can mitigate the clinical severity of the chondrodysplasia. However, a less predictable genotype/phenotype correlation has been found with a mutation described predominately in the Finnish population. This Finnish mutation is located in the splice site of the gene and results in low SLC26A2 mRNA levels. Different levels of expression of the SLC26A2 protein is probably the cause of the variable phenotypes described with this mutation.

== Functional significance of SLC26A2 in the colon and the kidney ==
Immunohistochemical analysis has localized SLC26A2 to the apical membrane of colon epithelial cells and kidney proximal tubule cells.

=== Colon ===
Abundant SLC26A2 mRNA levels have been identified in the small and large intestine of mice, rats and humans. In the human colon, SLC26A2 is present in the upper third of the crypts, where it is directed toward the apical membrane. The physiological role of SLC26A2 in the human colon remains to be determined, but it likely represent the sulfate/oxalate exchanger that has been characterized in colonic apical membrane vesicle preparations and possibly plays an important role in sulfate transport in this tissue. In fact, impaired sulfation has been suggested to occur during the course of malignant transformation of colonic epithelial cells, and studies have shown that the growth rate of cancer cells was markedly enhanced when the transcription of SLC26A2 was suppressed.

=== Kidney ===
The SLC26A2 protein has been localized to the brush border membrane of the rat kidney proximal tubule. In that location, oxalate–sulfate exchange, or chloride–sulfate exchange by SLC26A2 might contribute to the critical process of sodium chloride reabsorption across the proximal tubular epithelium. Under one proposed model, an anion transporter exchanges intracellular oxalate for luminal chloride in parallel with the sodium–sulfate cotransporter, resulting in net sodium chloride readsorption. Under this model, a third transport process is required that functions as a method of recycling oxalate back into the cell, and recycling sulfate from the cell to the lumen. Previously, SLC26A6, another member of the same family of anion transporters as DTDST, was thought to provide the mechanism of oxalate- or formate-mediated chloride transport in this nephron segment; however, recent studies in Slc26a6-knockout mice have raised questions regarding its role in this transport process. In contrast, the apical membrane location, and electrochemical properties of SLC26A2 would fit the requirement of an anion exchanger located on the apical membrane of the proximal tubule that would serve as a mechanism of transporting chloride in exchange for oxalate, and/or recycling oxalate in exchange for sulfate.
