= Thumb twiddling =

Action of the hands

Thumb twiddling

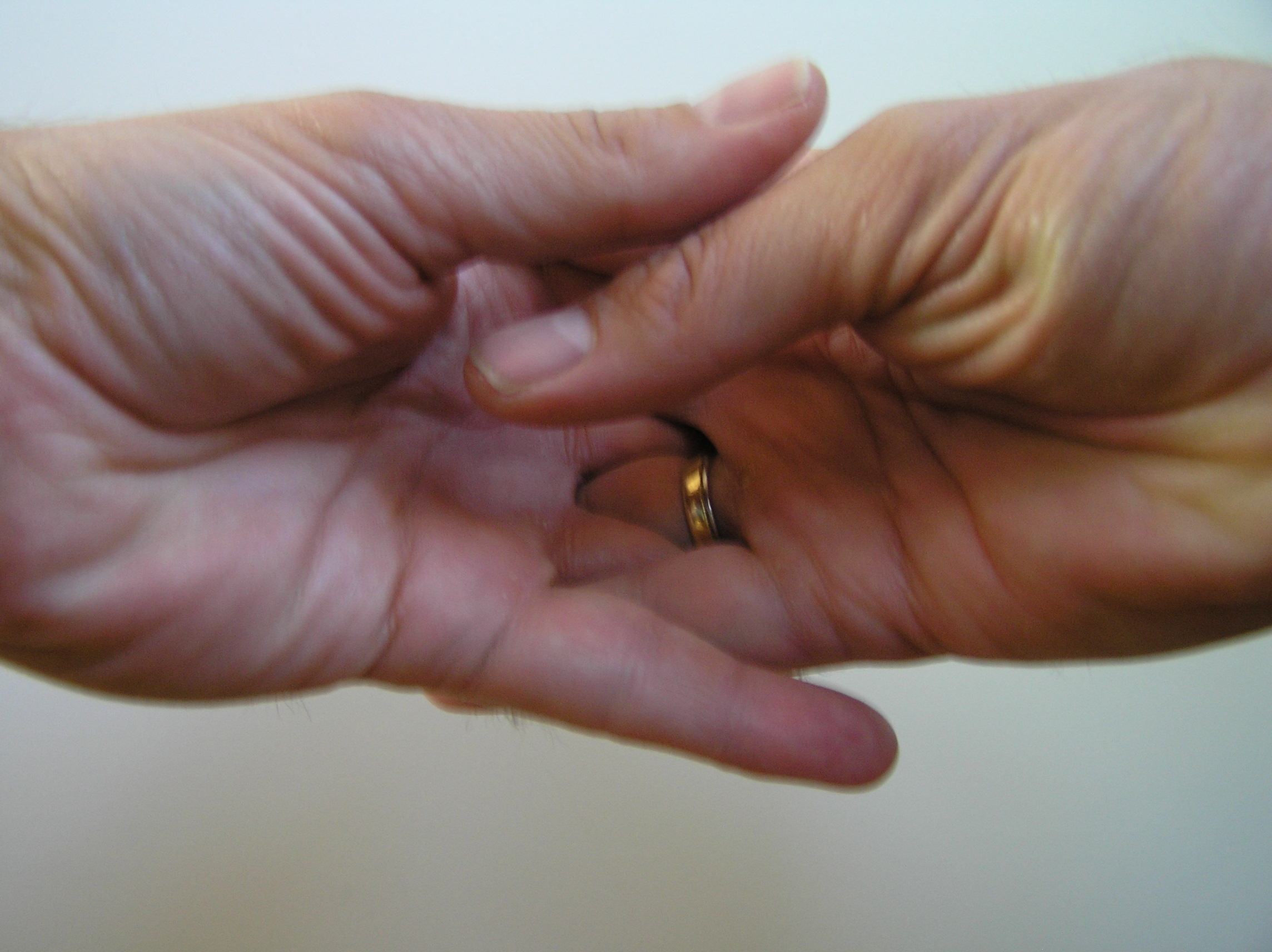
Position of fingers and thumbs for the practice of twiddling

Thumb twiddling is an activity that is done with the hands of an individual whereby the fingers are interlocked and the thumbs circle around a common point, usually in the middle of the distance between the two thumbs.

While it is an expression of at least a moderate amount of manual dexterity, thumb twiddling is frequently used as an example of a useless, time-wasting activity.

== Medical uses ==
Thumb twiddling can be used as a simple test for manual dexterity.

== Contra-rotating thumbs ==
Contra-rotation involves moving the thumbs in opposing directions. While thumb twiddling comes naturally for almost everyone, it is extremely rare for people to be able to naturally contra-rotate their thumbs without spending a significant amount of time training the new technique. Typically, a person will get through a half rotation before both of the thumbs will inexplicably synchronize directions. A similar phenomenon occurs using similar finger or arm movements.

== See also ==
- Thumb wrestling
