= Autosomal recessive multiple epiphyseal dysplasia =

- Autosomal recessive multiple epiphyseal dysplasia has an autosomal recessive pattern of inheritance.

Autosomal recessive multiple epiphyseal dysplasia (ARMED), also called epiphyseal dysplasia, multiple, 4 (EDM4), multiple epiphyseal dysplasia with clubfoot or –with bilayered patellae, is an autosomal recessive congenital disorder affecting cartilage and bone development. The disorder has relatively mild signs and symptoms, including joint pain, scoliosis, and malformations of the hands, feet, and knees.

Some affected individuals are born with an inward- and downward-turning foot (a clubfoot). An abnormality of the kneecap called a double-layered patella is also relatively common. Although some people with recessive multiple epiphyseal dysplasia have short stature as adults, most are of normal height. The incidence is unknown as many cases are not diagnosed due to mild symptoms.

== Cause ==
Mutations in the SLC26A2 (DTDST) gene, located at human chromosome 5q32-33.1, are the cause of ARMED. It is considered a milder disorder within a spectrum of skeletal disorders caused by mutations in the gene, which encodes a protein that is essential for the normal development of cartilage and its conversion to bone. Mutations in the SLC26A2 gene alter the structure of developing cartilage, preventing bones from forming properly and resulting in associated skeletal maldevelopment.

The disorder is inherited in an autosomal recessive manner. This means the defective gene responsible for the disorder is located on an autosome (chromosome 5 is an autosome), and two copies of the defective gene (one inherited from each parent) are required in order to be born with the disorder. The parents of an individual with an autosomal recessive disorder both carry one copy of the defective gene, but usually do not experience any signs or symptoms of the disorder.

== See also ==
- Multiple epiphyseal dysplasia
