= Hitchhiker's thumb =

Inherited trait where the thumb can bend backwards up to 90°

- Other names: Distal hyperextensibility of the thumb, thumb hypermobility, Z-shaped deformity, duck-bill thumb
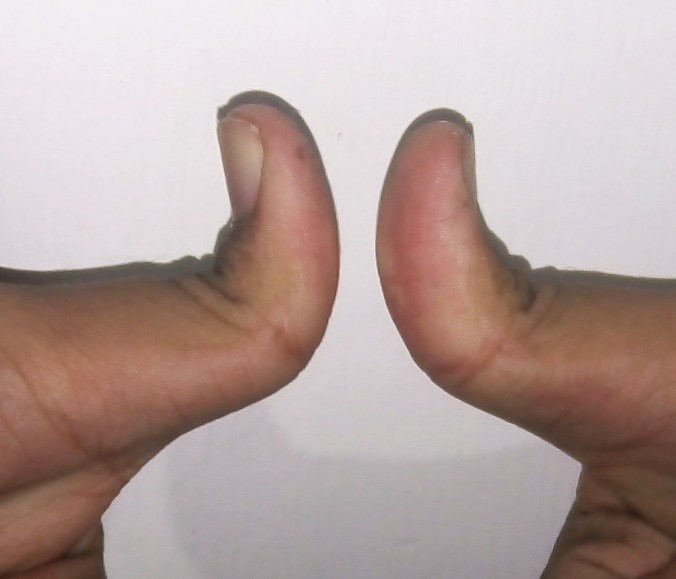
- Bilateral hitchhiker's thumb
- Specialty: Medical genetics
- Symptoms: A thumb joint that can bend backwards beyond the normal range of motion, up to a 90° degree angle
- Complications: Typically none, but may be associated with genetic diseases
- Duration: Lifelong
- Causes: Genetic (autosomal recessive)
- Risk factors: Family history
- Frequency: 24–36% of the U.S. population

Hitchhiker's thumb is an inherited trait where the distal phalange of the thumb can bend backwards beyond the normal range of motion, up to an angle of 90°. The trait can be present on one or both thumbs. It is typically painless and benign, but can sometimes be associated with genetic diseases such as hypermobility spectrum disorders.

== Etymology ==
The trait is named hitchhiker's thumb as it resembles the hand gesture used to hitch a ride on the side of a road.

== Signs and symptoms ==
Hitchhiker's thumb involves having a thumb with a distal phalange that is able to bend backwards beyond the normal range of motion (50°), up to an angle of 90°. Some people with hitchhiker's thumb also have a Z-shaped deformity, named after the appearance of this deformity. The trait in itself is usually painless and does not normally affect usage of the hands.

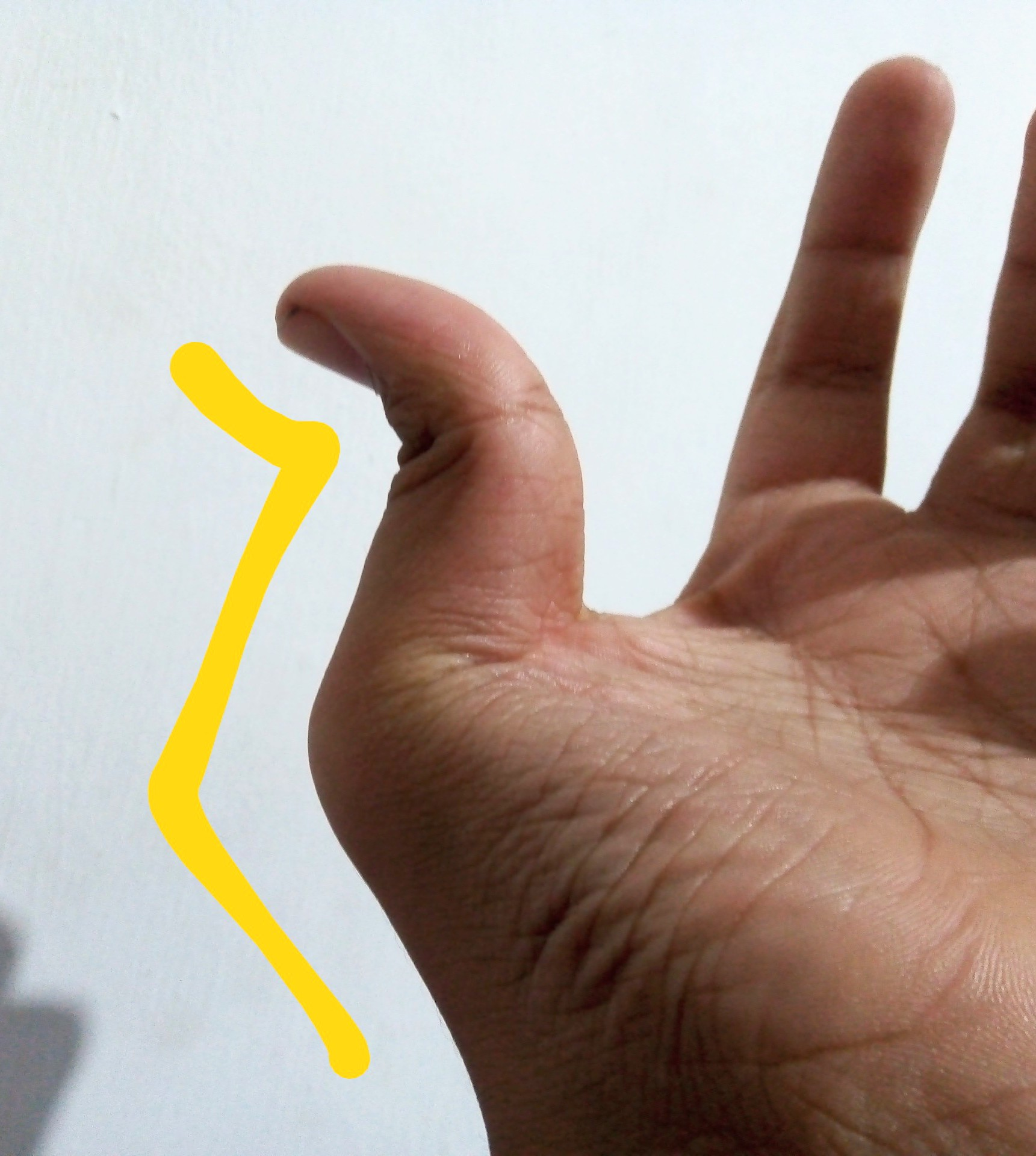
Z-shaped deformity in a hitchhiker's thumb

== Causes ==
Hitchhiker's thumb is a genetic trait and is inherited in an autosomal recessive manner. It may sometimes be associated with genetic diseases, including:

- diastrophic dysplasia
- hypermobility spectrum disorder
- atelosteogenesis, type II
- atelosteogenesis, type III

== Incidence ==
Hitchhiker's thumbs affect 24–36% of the U.S. population.

== See also ==
- Hypermobility (joints)
- Ligamentous laxity
- Hypermobility spectrum disorder
- Ehlers–Danlos syndromes
- Diastrophic dysplasia
