= Atelosteogenesis, type II =

- Atelosteogenesis, type II has an autosomal recessive pattern of inheritance.

Atelosteogenesis, type II is a severe disorder of cartilage and bone development. It is rare, and infants with the disorder are usually stillborn; those who survive birth die soon after.

== Symptoms and signs ==
Infants born with this condition have very short arms and legs, a narrow chest, and a prominent, rounded abdomen. This disorder is also characterized by an opening in the roof of the mouth (cleft palate), distinctive facial features, an inward- and downward-turning foot (clubfoot), and unusually positioned thumbs (hitchhiker thumbs).

The signs and symptoms of atelosteogenesis, type 2, are similar to those of another skeletal disorder called diastrophic dysplasia. Atelosteogenesis, type 2 tends to be more severe, however.

== Genetics ==
Atelosteogenesis, type 2 is one of a spectrum of skeletal disorders caused by mutations in the SLC26A2 gene. The protein made by this gene is essential for the normal development of cartilage and for its conversion to bone. Mutations in the SLC26A2 gene disrupt the structure of developing cartilage, preventing bones from forming properly and resulting in the skeletal problems characteristic of atelosteogenesis, type 2.

This condition is an autosomal recessive disorder, which means the defective gene is located on an autosome, and two copies of the gene—one from each parent—must be inherited for a child to be born with the disorder. The parents of a child with an autosomal recessive disorder are not affected by disorder, but are carriers of one copy of the altered gene.
