= Muk-jji-ppa =

Korean rock-paper-scissors variant

- Hangul: 묵찌빠
- RR: mukjjippa
- MR: muktchippa

Muk-jji-ppa (Korean: 묵찌빠) is a variant of the two-player game rock paper scissors. It originated in South Korea.

1. The game starts with an ordinary game of rock paper scissors (가위바위보).
2. Once someone wins, they become the attacker and the other player becomes the defender
3. The two then rhythmically show either muk (묵), jji (찌) or ppa (빠).
4. The attacker must shout their move each turn before they make it
5. The defender loses if they play the same move as the attacker. If not, the one who wins become the attacker and repeat it until they produce the same move.

묵 (muk)=Rock, 찌 (jji)=Scissors, 빠 (ppa)=Paper

== History ==
The basic idea of muk-jji-ppa is known to be originated from Japan after the victory of the Russo-Japanese war. The game it originated from, じゃんけん (janken), came from China around the 17th century.
